

349001–349100 

|-bgcolor=#d6d6d6
| 349001 ||  || — || October 27, 2006 || Mount Lemmon || Mount Lemmon Survey || — || align=right | 3.0 km || 
|-id=002 bgcolor=#d6d6d6
| 349002 ||  || — || October 27, 2006 || Mount Lemmon || Mount Lemmon Survey || THM || align=right | 2.3 km || 
|-id=003 bgcolor=#d6d6d6
| 349003 ||  || — || October 27, 2006 || Catalina || CSS || — || align=right | 4.7 km || 
|-id=004 bgcolor=#d6d6d6
| 349004 ||  || — || October 27, 2006 || Mount Lemmon || Mount Lemmon Survey || — || align=right | 3.0 km || 
|-id=005 bgcolor=#d6d6d6
| 349005 ||  || — || October 27, 2006 || Mount Lemmon || Mount Lemmon Survey || EOS || align=right | 2.0 km || 
|-id=006 bgcolor=#E9E9E9
| 349006 ||  || — || October 27, 2006 || Kitt Peak || Spacewatch || — || align=right | 1.5 km || 
|-id=007 bgcolor=#d6d6d6
| 349007 ||  || — || October 27, 2006 || Kitt Peak || Spacewatch || — || align=right | 3.4 km || 
|-id=008 bgcolor=#d6d6d6
| 349008 ||  || — || October 27, 2006 || Kitt Peak || Spacewatch || THB || align=right | 4.3 km || 
|-id=009 bgcolor=#E9E9E9
| 349009 ||  || — || October 27, 2006 || Kitt Peak || Spacewatch || — || align=right | 1.4 km || 
|-id=010 bgcolor=#E9E9E9
| 349010 ||  || — || October 28, 2006 || Calvin-Rehoboth || L. A. Molnar || — || align=right | 2.2 km || 
|-id=011 bgcolor=#d6d6d6
| 349011 ||  || — || October 2, 2006 || Mount Lemmon || Mount Lemmon Survey || HYG || align=right | 2.7 km || 
|-id=012 bgcolor=#d6d6d6
| 349012 ||  || — || October 28, 2006 || Mount Lemmon || Mount Lemmon Survey || — || align=right | 3.2 km || 
|-id=013 bgcolor=#fefefe
| 349013 ||  || — || October 28, 2006 || Kitt Peak || Spacewatch || MAS || align=right data-sort-value="0.79" | 790 m || 
|-id=014 bgcolor=#d6d6d6
| 349014 ||  || — || October 29, 2006 || Kitt Peak || Spacewatch || — || align=right | 3.6 km || 
|-id=015 bgcolor=#d6d6d6
| 349015 ||  || — || October 14, 2006 || Lulin Observatory || Lulin Obs. || — || align=right | 3.3 km || 
|-id=016 bgcolor=#d6d6d6
| 349016 ||  || — || October 31, 2006 || Kitt Peak || Spacewatch || — || align=right | 3.7 km || 
|-id=017 bgcolor=#d6d6d6
| 349017 ||  || — || October 16, 2006 || Apache Point || A. C. Becker || — || align=right | 3.6 km || 
|-id=018 bgcolor=#d6d6d6
| 349018 ||  || — || October 26, 2006 || Mauna Kea || P. A. Wiegert || — || align=right | 2.9 km || 
|-id=019 bgcolor=#d6d6d6
| 349019 ||  || — || October 21, 2006 || Mount Lemmon || Mount Lemmon Survey || — || align=right | 2.2 km || 
|-id=020 bgcolor=#d6d6d6
| 349020 ||  || — || October 21, 2006 || Catalina || CSS || — || align=right | 4.7 km || 
|-id=021 bgcolor=#d6d6d6
| 349021 ||  || — || November 10, 2006 || Kitt Peak || Spacewatch || THM || align=right | 2.6 km || 
|-id=022 bgcolor=#d6d6d6
| 349022 ||  || — || November 11, 2006 || Catalina || CSS || — || align=right | 3.6 km || 
|-id=023 bgcolor=#d6d6d6
| 349023 ||  || — || November 11, 2006 || Mount Lemmon || Mount Lemmon Survey || — || align=right | 4.9 km || 
|-id=024 bgcolor=#d6d6d6
| 349024 ||  || — || November 1, 2006 || Catalina || CSS || EUP || align=right | 7.9 km || 
|-id=025 bgcolor=#d6d6d6
| 349025 ||  || — || November 9, 2006 || Kitt Peak || Spacewatch || — || align=right | 3.0 km || 
|-id=026 bgcolor=#d6d6d6
| 349026 ||  || — || November 9, 2006 || Kitt Peak || Spacewatch || VER || align=right | 2.8 km || 
|-id=027 bgcolor=#d6d6d6
| 349027 ||  || — || November 10, 2006 || Kitt Peak || Spacewatch || — || align=right | 3.3 km || 
|-id=028 bgcolor=#d6d6d6
| 349028 ||  || — || November 10, 2006 || Kitt Peak || Spacewatch || THM || align=right | 2.4 km || 
|-id=029 bgcolor=#d6d6d6
| 349029 ||  || — || September 26, 2006 || Mount Lemmon || Mount Lemmon Survey || — || align=right | 3.2 km || 
|-id=030 bgcolor=#d6d6d6
| 349030 ||  || — || November 11, 2006 || Mount Lemmon || Mount Lemmon Survey || — || align=right | 3.1 km || 
|-id=031 bgcolor=#E9E9E9
| 349031 ||  || — || October 16, 2006 || Catalina || CSS || — || align=right | 2.1 km || 
|-id=032 bgcolor=#d6d6d6
| 349032 ||  || — || November 11, 2006 || Palomar || NEAT || EUP || align=right | 4.1 km || 
|-id=033 bgcolor=#d6d6d6
| 349033 ||  || — || November 12, 2006 || Mount Lemmon || Mount Lemmon Survey || — || align=right | 3.7 km || 
|-id=034 bgcolor=#d6d6d6
| 349034 ||  || — || November 10, 2006 || Kitt Peak || Spacewatch || — || align=right | 3.3 km || 
|-id=035 bgcolor=#d6d6d6
| 349035 ||  || — || November 10, 2006 || Kitt Peak || Spacewatch || HYG || align=right | 2.8 km || 
|-id=036 bgcolor=#E9E9E9
| 349036 ||  || — || October 31, 2006 || Kitt Peak || Spacewatch || — || align=right data-sort-value="0.71" | 710 m || 
|-id=037 bgcolor=#E9E9E9
| 349037 ||  || — || November 11, 2006 || Kitt Peak || Spacewatch || KON || align=right | 2.5 km || 
|-id=038 bgcolor=#d6d6d6
| 349038 ||  || — || November 11, 2006 || Kitt Peak || Spacewatch || THM || align=right | 2.1 km || 
|-id=039 bgcolor=#E9E9E9
| 349039 ||  || — || November 11, 2006 || Kitt Peak || Spacewatch || — || align=right | 2.1 km || 
|-id=040 bgcolor=#E9E9E9
| 349040 ||  || — || November 11, 2006 || Mount Lemmon || Mount Lemmon Survey || — || align=right | 2.2 km || 
|-id=041 bgcolor=#d6d6d6
| 349041 ||  || — || November 13, 2006 || Mount Lemmon || Mount Lemmon Survey || — || align=right | 2.7 km || 
|-id=042 bgcolor=#d6d6d6
| 349042 ||  || — || October 21, 2006 || Kitt Peak || Spacewatch || HYG || align=right | 3.3 km || 
|-id=043 bgcolor=#d6d6d6
| 349043 ||  || — || November 11, 2006 || Kitt Peak || Spacewatch || — || align=right | 4.4 km || 
|-id=044 bgcolor=#d6d6d6
| 349044 ||  || — || November 14, 2006 || Junk Bond || D. Healy || — || align=right | 3.0 km || 
|-id=045 bgcolor=#d6d6d6
| 349045 ||  || — || September 25, 2006 || Kitt Peak || Spacewatch || — || align=right | 2.8 km || 
|-id=046 bgcolor=#d6d6d6
| 349046 ||  || — || November 15, 2006 || Mount Lemmon || Mount Lemmon Survey || — || align=right | 4.3 km || 
|-id=047 bgcolor=#d6d6d6
| 349047 ||  || — || November 14, 2006 || Kitt Peak || Spacewatch || — || align=right | 4.5 km || 
|-id=048 bgcolor=#d6d6d6
| 349048 ||  || — || November 9, 2006 || Palomar || NEAT || — || align=right | 3.4 km || 
|-id=049 bgcolor=#d6d6d6
| 349049 ||  || — || November 11, 2006 || Kitt Peak || Spacewatch || — || align=right | 3.7 km || 
|-id=050 bgcolor=#d6d6d6
| 349050 ||  || — || November 11, 2006 || Kitt Peak || Spacewatch || — || align=right | 3.6 km || 
|-id=051 bgcolor=#d6d6d6
| 349051 ||  || — || November 19, 2006 || Needville || Needville Obs. || EUP || align=right | 4.1 km || 
|-id=052 bgcolor=#d6d6d6
| 349052 ||  || — || November 16, 2006 || Socorro || LINEAR || — || align=right | 3.0 km || 
|-id=053 bgcolor=#d6d6d6
| 349053 ||  || — || November 16, 2006 || Kitt Peak || Spacewatch || — || align=right | 3.8 km || 
|-id=054 bgcolor=#E9E9E9
| 349054 ||  || — || November 1, 2006 || Mount Lemmon || Mount Lemmon Survey || — || align=right | 1.4 km || 
|-id=055 bgcolor=#d6d6d6
| 349055 ||  || — || November 18, 2006 || Kitt Peak || Spacewatch || — || align=right | 3.5 km || 
|-id=056 bgcolor=#d6d6d6
| 349056 ||  || — || November 18, 2006 || Kitt Peak || Spacewatch || — || align=right | 3.0 km || 
|-id=057 bgcolor=#d6d6d6
| 349057 ||  || — || November 19, 2006 || Catalina || CSS || — || align=right | 3.1 km || 
|-id=058 bgcolor=#d6d6d6
| 349058 ||  || — || November 18, 2006 || Mount Lemmon || Mount Lemmon Survey || HYG || align=right | 2.5 km || 
|-id=059 bgcolor=#E9E9E9
| 349059 ||  || — || November 20, 2006 || Kitt Peak || Spacewatch || — || align=right | 1.9 km || 
|-id=060 bgcolor=#d6d6d6
| 349060 ||  || — || November 22, 2006 || Mount Lemmon || Mount Lemmon Survey || — || align=right | 3.2 km || 
|-id=061 bgcolor=#d6d6d6
| 349061 ||  || — || November 23, 2006 || Mount Lemmon || Mount Lemmon Survey || — || align=right | 3.3 km || 
|-id=062 bgcolor=#d6d6d6
| 349062 ||  || — || November 27, 2006 || Kitt Peak || Spacewatch || THM || align=right | 2.8 km || 
|-id=063 bgcolor=#FFC2E0
| 349063 ||  || — || December 1, 2006 || Catalina || CSS || APO +1km || align=right | 1.1 km || 
|-id=064 bgcolor=#E9E9E9
| 349064 ||  || — || December 9, 2006 || Palomar || NEAT || — || align=right | 2.1 km || 
|-id=065 bgcolor=#d6d6d6
| 349065 ||  || — || December 10, 2006 || Kitt Peak || Spacewatch || HYG || align=right | 2.5 km || 
|-id=066 bgcolor=#E9E9E9
| 349066 ||  || — || September 28, 2006 || Kitt Peak || Spacewatch || — || align=right | 1.1 km || 
|-id=067 bgcolor=#E9E9E9
| 349067 ||  || — || December 9, 2006 || Palomar || NEAT || — || align=right | 2.7 km || 
|-id=068 bgcolor=#FFC2E0
| 349068 ||  || — || December 26, 2006 || Catalina || CSS || APOPHA || align=right data-sort-value="0.5" | 500 m || 
|-id=069 bgcolor=#d6d6d6
| 349069 ||  || — || December 25, 2006 || Piszkéstető || K. Sárneczky || — || align=right | 3.0 km || 
|-id=070 bgcolor=#E9E9E9
| 349070 ||  || — || December 15, 2006 || Kitt Peak || Spacewatch || GEF || align=right | 2.0 km || 
|-id=071 bgcolor=#fefefe
| 349071 ||  || — || January 8, 2007 || Kitt Peak || Spacewatch || — || align=right | 1.0 km || 
|-id=072 bgcolor=#fefefe
| 349072 ||  || — || January 9, 2007 || Mount Lemmon || Mount Lemmon Survey || — || align=right | 1.5 km || 
|-id=073 bgcolor=#fefefe
| 349073 ||  || — || January 9, 2007 || Kitt Peak || Spacewatch || FLO || align=right data-sort-value="0.84" | 840 m || 
|-id=074 bgcolor=#FFC2E0
| 349074 ||  || — || January 25, 2007 || Anderson Mesa || LONEOS || APO || align=right | 1.1 km || 
|-id=075 bgcolor=#fefefe
| 349075 ||  || — || January 26, 2007 || Kitt Peak || Spacewatch || — || align=right data-sort-value="0.88" | 880 m || 
|-id=076 bgcolor=#fefefe
| 349076 ||  || — || January 27, 2007 || Mount Lemmon || Mount Lemmon Survey || — || align=right data-sort-value="0.81" | 810 m || 
|-id=077 bgcolor=#E9E9E9
| 349077 ||  || — || January 27, 2007 || Kitt Peak || Spacewatch || — || align=right | 2.1 km || 
|-id=078 bgcolor=#fefefe
| 349078 ||  || — || February 7, 2007 || Mount Lemmon || Mount Lemmon Survey || NYS || align=right data-sort-value="0.64" | 640 m || 
|-id=079 bgcolor=#fefefe
| 349079 ||  || — || February 8, 2007 || Mount Lemmon || Mount Lemmon Survey || — || align=right data-sort-value="0.95" | 950 m || 
|-id=080 bgcolor=#fefefe
| 349080 ||  || — || February 10, 2007 || Mount Lemmon || Mount Lemmon Survey || — || align=right data-sort-value="0.67" | 670 m || 
|-id=081 bgcolor=#d6d6d6
| 349081 ||  || — || February 10, 2007 || Mount Lemmon || Mount Lemmon Survey || — || align=right | 5.0 km || 
|-id=082 bgcolor=#fefefe
| 349082 ||  || — || September 30, 2005 || Kitt Peak || Spacewatch || FLO || align=right data-sort-value="0.80" | 800 m || 
|-id=083 bgcolor=#fefefe
| 349083 ||  || — || February 17, 2007 || Kitt Peak || Spacewatch || FLO || align=right | 1.8 km || 
|-id=084 bgcolor=#fefefe
| 349084 ||  || — || February 17, 2007 || Kitt Peak || Spacewatch || — || align=right | 1.8 km || 
|-id=085 bgcolor=#fefefe
| 349085 ||  || — || February 17, 2007 || Kitt Peak || Spacewatch || FLO || align=right data-sort-value="0.64" | 640 m || 
|-id=086 bgcolor=#d6d6d6
| 349086 ||  || — || February 19, 2007 || Mount Lemmon || Mount Lemmon Survey || — || align=right | 3.4 km || 
|-id=087 bgcolor=#fefefe
| 349087 ||  || — || February 19, 2007 || Mount Lemmon || Mount Lemmon Survey || NYS || align=right data-sort-value="0.81" | 810 m || 
|-id=088 bgcolor=#fefefe
| 349088 ||  || — || September 12, 2001 || Socorro || LINEAR || — || align=right data-sort-value="0.97" | 970 m || 
|-id=089 bgcolor=#fefefe
| 349089 ||  || — || January 27, 2007 || Mount Lemmon || Mount Lemmon Survey || NYS || align=right data-sort-value="0.74" | 740 m || 
|-id=090 bgcolor=#fefefe
| 349090 ||  || — || February 23, 2007 || Kitt Peak || Spacewatch || — || align=right data-sort-value="0.73" | 730 m || 
|-id=091 bgcolor=#fefefe
| 349091 ||  || — || March 9, 2007 || Kitt Peak || Spacewatch || FLO || align=right data-sort-value="0.83" | 830 m || 
|-id=092 bgcolor=#fefefe
| 349092 ||  || — || March 10, 2007 || Kitt Peak || Spacewatch || — || align=right | 2.4 km || 
|-id=093 bgcolor=#fefefe
| 349093 ||  || — || March 10, 2007 || Kitt Peak || Spacewatch || V || align=right data-sort-value="0.59" | 590 m || 
|-id=094 bgcolor=#fefefe
| 349094 ||  || — || March 10, 2007 || Mount Lemmon || Mount Lemmon Survey || — || align=right data-sort-value="0.79" | 790 m || 
|-id=095 bgcolor=#d6d6d6
| 349095 ||  || — || March 10, 2007 || Palomar || NEAT || — || align=right | 5.2 km || 
|-id=096 bgcolor=#fefefe
| 349096 ||  || — || March 11, 2007 || Kitt Peak || Spacewatch || — || align=right | 1.5 km || 
|-id=097 bgcolor=#fefefe
| 349097 ||  || — || January 2, 2000 || Kitt Peak || Spacewatch || — || align=right | 2.0 km || 
|-id=098 bgcolor=#fefefe
| 349098 ||  || — || March 14, 2007 || Kitt Peak || Spacewatch || — || align=right data-sort-value="0.96" | 960 m || 
|-id=099 bgcolor=#fefefe
| 349099 ||  || — || March 8, 2007 || Palomar || NEAT || — || align=right data-sort-value="0.86" | 860 m || 
|-id=100 bgcolor=#fefefe
| 349100 ||  || — || August 30, 2005 || Kitt Peak || Spacewatch || — || align=right data-sort-value="0.73" | 730 m || 
|}

349101–349200 

|-bgcolor=#fefefe
| 349101 ||  || — || March 15, 2007 || Mount Lemmon || Mount Lemmon Survey || V || align=right data-sort-value="0.80" | 800 m || 
|-id=102 bgcolor=#fefefe
| 349102 ||  || — || March 18, 2007 || Kitt Peak || Spacewatch || V || align=right data-sort-value="0.72" | 720 m || 
|-id=103 bgcolor=#fefefe
| 349103 ||  || — || March 20, 2007 || Mount Lemmon || Mount Lemmon Survey || FLO || align=right data-sort-value="0.78" | 780 m || 
|-id=104 bgcolor=#fefefe
| 349104 ||  || — || March 9, 2007 || Kitt Peak || Spacewatch || — || align=right data-sort-value="0.91" | 910 m || 
|-id=105 bgcolor=#fefefe
| 349105 ||  || — || April 7, 2007 || Mount Lemmon || Mount Lemmon Survey || FLO || align=right data-sort-value="0.64" | 640 m || 
|-id=106 bgcolor=#fefefe
| 349106 ||  || — || April 11, 2007 || Kitt Peak || Spacewatch || — || align=right data-sort-value="0.71" | 710 m || 
|-id=107 bgcolor=#E9E9E9
| 349107 ||  || — || April 11, 2007 || Kitt Peak || Spacewatch || — || align=right | 2.7 km || 
|-id=108 bgcolor=#fefefe
| 349108 ||  || — || April 11, 2007 || Kitt Peak || Spacewatch || FLO || align=right data-sort-value="0.58" | 580 m || 
|-id=109 bgcolor=#fefefe
| 349109 ||  || — || April 11, 2007 || Kitt Peak || Spacewatch || V || align=right data-sort-value="0.89" | 890 m || 
|-id=110 bgcolor=#fefefe
| 349110 ||  || — || April 11, 2007 || Kitt Peak || Spacewatch || NYS || align=right data-sort-value="0.83" | 830 m || 
|-id=111 bgcolor=#fefefe
| 349111 ||  || — || April 11, 2007 || Kitt Peak || Spacewatch || MAS || align=right data-sort-value="0.86" | 860 m || 
|-id=112 bgcolor=#fefefe
| 349112 ||  || — || April 11, 2007 || Kitt Peak || Spacewatch || NYS || align=right data-sort-value="0.67" | 670 m || 
|-id=113 bgcolor=#fefefe
| 349113 ||  || — || April 13, 2007 || Siding Spring || SSS || PHO || align=right | 1.4 km || 
|-id=114 bgcolor=#fefefe
| 349114 ||  || — || March 13, 2007 || Mount Lemmon || Mount Lemmon Survey || — || align=right | 1.1 km || 
|-id=115 bgcolor=#fefefe
| 349115 ||  || — || April 14, 2007 || Kitt Peak || Spacewatch || MAS || align=right data-sort-value="0.88" | 880 m || 
|-id=116 bgcolor=#fefefe
| 349116 ||  || — || April 25, 2000 || Kitt Peak || Spacewatch || — || align=right data-sort-value="0.65" | 650 m || 
|-id=117 bgcolor=#fefefe
| 349117 ||  || — || April 15, 2007 || Mount Lemmon || Mount Lemmon Survey || — || align=right data-sort-value="0.57" | 570 m || 
|-id=118 bgcolor=#E9E9E9
| 349118 ||  || — || March 14, 2007 || Siding Spring || SSS || — || align=right | 1.7 km || 
|-id=119 bgcolor=#fefefe
| 349119 ||  || — || April 16, 2007 || Mount Lemmon || Mount Lemmon Survey || FLO || align=right data-sort-value="0.56" | 560 m || 
|-id=120 bgcolor=#fefefe
| 349120 ||  || — || April 18, 2007 || Mount Lemmon || Mount Lemmon Survey || FLO || align=right data-sort-value="0.53" | 530 m || 
|-id=121 bgcolor=#fefefe
| 349121 ||  || — || April 18, 2007 || Kitt Peak || Spacewatch || FLO || align=right data-sort-value="0.70" | 700 m || 
|-id=122 bgcolor=#fefefe
| 349122 ||  || — || April 18, 2007 || Kitt Peak || Spacewatch || MAS || align=right data-sort-value="0.78" | 780 m || 
|-id=123 bgcolor=#fefefe
| 349123 ||  || — || November 21, 2005 || Kitt Peak || Spacewatch || V || align=right data-sort-value="0.61" | 610 m || 
|-id=124 bgcolor=#fefefe
| 349124 ||  || — || April 18, 2007 || Kitt Peak || Spacewatch || — || align=right data-sort-value="0.98" | 980 m || 
|-id=125 bgcolor=#fefefe
| 349125 ||  || — || April 20, 2007 || Kitt Peak || Spacewatch || — || align=right data-sort-value="0.83" | 830 m || 
|-id=126 bgcolor=#fefefe
| 349126 ||  || — || April 20, 2007 || Kitt Peak || Spacewatch || — || align=right data-sort-value="0.66" | 660 m || 
|-id=127 bgcolor=#E9E9E9
| 349127 ||  || — || April 22, 2007 || Mount Lemmon || Mount Lemmon Survey || BAR || align=right | 1.9 km || 
|-id=128 bgcolor=#E9E9E9
| 349128 ||  || — || March 15, 2007 || Mount Lemmon || Mount Lemmon Survey || — || align=right | 1.4 km || 
|-id=129 bgcolor=#fefefe
| 349129 ||  || — || April 22, 2007 || Kitt Peak || Spacewatch || NYS || align=right data-sort-value="0.66" | 660 m || 
|-id=130 bgcolor=#d6d6d6
| 349130 ||  || — || April 22, 2007 || Kitt Peak || Spacewatch || EOS || align=right | 2.2 km || 
|-id=131 bgcolor=#fefefe
| 349131 ||  || — || April 25, 2007 || Mount Lemmon || Mount Lemmon Survey || — || align=right data-sort-value="0.68" | 680 m || 
|-id=132 bgcolor=#fefefe
| 349132 ||  || — || April 25, 2007 || Kitt Peak || Spacewatch || V || align=right data-sort-value="0.62" | 620 m || 
|-id=133 bgcolor=#E9E9E9
| 349133 ||  || — || January 25, 2007 || Siding Spring || SSS || BAR || align=right | 2.1 km || 
|-id=134 bgcolor=#fefefe
| 349134 ||  || — || May 7, 2007 || Kitt Peak || Spacewatch || MAS || align=right data-sort-value="0.76" | 760 m || 
|-id=135 bgcolor=#fefefe
| 349135 ||  || — || May 10, 2007 || Mount Lemmon || Mount Lemmon Survey || FLO || align=right data-sort-value="0.50" | 500 m || 
|-id=136 bgcolor=#E9E9E9
| 349136 ||  || — || May 7, 2007 || Kitt Peak || Spacewatch || — || align=right | 1.1 km || 
|-id=137 bgcolor=#E9E9E9
| 349137 ||  || — || April 25, 2007 || Mount Lemmon || Mount Lemmon Survey || EUN || align=right | 1.1 km || 
|-id=138 bgcolor=#fefefe
| 349138 ||  || — || May 10, 2007 || Anderson Mesa || LONEOS || — || align=right | 1.3 km || 
|-id=139 bgcolor=#fefefe
| 349139 ||  || — || May 11, 2007 || Mount Lemmon || Mount Lemmon Survey || — || align=right data-sort-value="0.94" | 940 m || 
|-id=140 bgcolor=#fefefe
| 349140 ||  || — || May 9, 2007 || Catalina || CSS || — || align=right | 1.8 km || 
|-id=141 bgcolor=#fefefe
| 349141 ||  || — || May 26, 2007 || Siding Spring || SSS || — || align=right | 1.7 km || 
|-id=142 bgcolor=#E9E9E9
| 349142 ||  || — || May 26, 2007 || Mount Lemmon || Mount Lemmon Survey || fast? || align=right | 1.3 km || 
|-id=143 bgcolor=#fefefe
| 349143 ||  || — || June 8, 2007 || Kitt Peak || Spacewatch || V || align=right data-sort-value="0.68" | 680 m || 
|-id=144 bgcolor=#fefefe
| 349144 ||  || — || June 8, 2007 || Kitt Peak || Spacewatch || V || align=right data-sort-value="0.67" | 670 m || 
|-id=145 bgcolor=#E9E9E9
| 349145 ||  || — || January 27, 2001 || Haleakala || NEAT || RAF || align=right | 1.1 km || 
|-id=146 bgcolor=#E9E9E9
| 349146 ||  || — || June 16, 2007 || Kitt Peak || Spacewatch || — || align=right data-sort-value="0.97" | 970 m || 
|-id=147 bgcolor=#fefefe
| 349147 ||  || — || June 21, 2007 || Mount Lemmon || Mount Lemmon Survey || — || align=right | 1.0 km || 
|-id=148 bgcolor=#E9E9E9
| 349148 ||  || — || June 21, 2007 || Mount Lemmon || Mount Lemmon Survey || — || align=right data-sort-value="0.97" | 970 m || 
|-id=149 bgcolor=#fefefe
| 349149 ||  || — || July 13, 2007 || La Sagra || OAM Obs. || PHO || align=right | 1.5 km || 
|-id=150 bgcolor=#E9E9E9
| 349150 ||  || — || July 10, 2007 || Siding Spring || SSS || — || align=right | 1.8 km || 
|-id=151 bgcolor=#E9E9E9
| 349151 ||  || — || July 10, 2007 || Siding Spring || SSS || — || align=right | 1.5 km || 
|-id=152 bgcolor=#fefefe
| 349152 ||  || — || July 19, 2007 || Tiki || S. F. Hönig, N. Teamo || V || align=right data-sort-value="0.82" | 820 m || 
|-id=153 bgcolor=#E9E9E9
| 349153 ||  || — || July 20, 2007 || Tiki || S. F. Hönig, N. Teamo || EUN || align=right | 1.5 km || 
|-id=154 bgcolor=#fefefe
| 349154 ||  || — || July 22, 2007 || Lulin Observatory || LUSS || — || align=right | 1.2 km || 
|-id=155 bgcolor=#E9E9E9
| 349155 ||  || — || August 6, 2007 || Lulin || LUSS || MAR || align=right | 1.4 km || 
|-id=156 bgcolor=#E9E9E9
| 349156 ||  || — || August 9, 2007 || Socorro || LINEAR || — || align=right | 1.3 km || 
|-id=157 bgcolor=#fefefe
| 349157 ||  || — || August 5, 2007 || Socorro || LINEAR || PHO || align=right | 1.5 km || 
|-id=158 bgcolor=#E9E9E9
| 349158 ||  || — || August 8, 2007 || Socorro || LINEAR || — || align=right | 2.8 km || 
|-id=159 bgcolor=#E9E9E9
| 349159 ||  || — || August 14, 2007 || Tiki || S. F. Hönig, N. Teamo || — || align=right | 1.5 km || 
|-id=160 bgcolor=#E9E9E9
| 349160 ||  || — || August 15, 2007 || Hibiscus || S. F. Hönig, N. Teamo || JUN || align=right | 1.2 km || 
|-id=161 bgcolor=#E9E9E9
| 349161 ||  || — || August 13, 2007 || Socorro || LINEAR || — || align=right | 2.9 km || 
|-id=162 bgcolor=#E9E9E9
| 349162 ||  || — || August 13, 2007 || Socorro || LINEAR || EUN || align=right | 1.2 km || 
|-id=163 bgcolor=#fefefe
| 349163 ||  || — || August 15, 2007 || Siding Spring || SSS || FLO || align=right | 1.3 km || 
|-id=164 bgcolor=#E9E9E9
| 349164 ||  || — || August 13, 2007 || Socorro || LINEAR || — || align=right | 1.9 km || 
|-id=165 bgcolor=#E9E9E9
| 349165 ||  || — || August 8, 2007 || Socorro || LINEAR || — || align=right | 2.6 km || 
|-id=166 bgcolor=#E9E9E9
| 349166 ||  || — || August 10, 2007 || Kitt Peak || Spacewatch || — || align=right | 1.7 km || 
|-id=167 bgcolor=#E9E9E9
| 349167 ||  || — || September 18, 2003 || Kitt Peak || Spacewatch || — || align=right | 1.5 km || 
|-id=168 bgcolor=#E9E9E9
| 349168 ||  || — || August 23, 2007 || Kitt Peak || Spacewatch || AGN || align=right | 1.2 km || 
|-id=169 bgcolor=#d6d6d6
| 349169 ||  || — || August 16, 2007 || Socorro || LINEAR || EUP || align=right | 3.9 km || 
|-id=170 bgcolor=#E9E9E9
| 349170 ||  || — || September 5, 2007 || Majorca || OAM Obs. || AEO || align=right | 1.4 km || 
|-id=171 bgcolor=#E9E9E9
| 349171 ||  || — || September 5, 2007 || Marly || P. Kocher || — || align=right | 1.9 km || 
|-id=172 bgcolor=#E9E9E9
| 349172 ||  || — || September 3, 2007 || Catalina || CSS || — || align=right | 3.2 km || 
|-id=173 bgcolor=#E9E9E9
| 349173 ||  || — || August 12, 2007 || Socorro || LINEAR || EUN || align=right | 1.7 km || 
|-id=174 bgcolor=#d6d6d6
| 349174 ||  || — || September 9, 2007 || Kitt Peak || Spacewatch || — || align=right | 2.7 km || 
|-id=175 bgcolor=#E9E9E9
| 349175 ||  || — || September 9, 2007 || Kitt Peak || Spacewatch || — || align=right | 1.6 km || 
|-id=176 bgcolor=#E9E9E9
| 349176 ||  || — || September 27, 2003 || Kitt Peak || Spacewatch || — || align=right | 1.4 km || 
|-id=177 bgcolor=#fefefe
| 349177 ||  || — || September 10, 2007 || Kitt Peak || Spacewatch || NYS || align=right data-sort-value="0.68" | 680 m || 
|-id=178 bgcolor=#E9E9E9
| 349178 ||  || — || September 10, 2007 || Mount Lemmon || Mount Lemmon Survey || — || align=right data-sort-value="0.79" | 790 m || 
|-id=179 bgcolor=#E9E9E9
| 349179 ||  || — || September 10, 2007 || Kitt Peak || Spacewatch || — || align=right | 2.2 km || 
|-id=180 bgcolor=#E9E9E9
| 349180 ||  || — || September 11, 2007 || Catalina || CSS || — || align=right | 2.2 km || 
|-id=181 bgcolor=#E9E9E9
| 349181 ||  || — || September 11, 2007 || Catalina || CSS || — || align=right | 2.0 km || 
|-id=182 bgcolor=#E9E9E9
| 349182 ||  || — || September 11, 2007 || Kitt Peak || Spacewatch || — || align=right | 1.9 km || 
|-id=183 bgcolor=#E9E9E9
| 349183 ||  || — || September 26, 1995 || Kitt Peak || Spacewatch || — || align=right | 1.0 km || 
|-id=184 bgcolor=#E9E9E9
| 349184 ||  || — || September 12, 2007 || Catalina || CSS || — || align=right | 2.9 km || 
|-id=185 bgcolor=#d6d6d6
| 349185 ||  || — || September 12, 2007 || Mount Lemmon || Mount Lemmon Survey || THM || align=right | 2.3 km || 
|-id=186 bgcolor=#E9E9E9
| 349186 ||  || — || September 13, 2007 || Socorro || LINEAR || — || align=right | 3.2 km || 
|-id=187 bgcolor=#d6d6d6
| 349187 ||  || — || September 11, 2007 || Purple Mountain || PMO NEO || ITH || align=right | 1.2 km || 
|-id=188 bgcolor=#d6d6d6
| 349188 ||  || — || September 12, 2007 || Catalina || CSS || TIR || align=right | 3.5 km || 
|-id=189 bgcolor=#E9E9E9
| 349189 ||  || — || September 11, 2007 || Purple Mountain || PMO NEO || — || align=right | 2.7 km || 
|-id=190 bgcolor=#E9E9E9
| 349190 ||  || — || September 10, 2007 || Kitt Peak || Spacewatch || — || align=right | 1.5 km || 
|-id=191 bgcolor=#E9E9E9
| 349191 ||  || — || September 10, 2007 || Kitt Peak || Spacewatch || HEN || align=right data-sort-value="0.98" | 980 m || 
|-id=192 bgcolor=#fefefe
| 349192 ||  || — || September 10, 2007 || Kitt Peak || Spacewatch || — || align=right data-sort-value="0.82" | 820 m || 
|-id=193 bgcolor=#E9E9E9
| 349193 ||  || — || September 10, 2007 || Kitt Peak || Spacewatch || — || align=right | 1.7 km || 
|-id=194 bgcolor=#E9E9E9
| 349194 ||  || — || September 11, 2007 || Mount Lemmon || Mount Lemmon Survey || — || align=right | 1.4 km || 
|-id=195 bgcolor=#E9E9E9
| 349195 ||  || — || September 10, 2007 || Kitt Peak || Spacewatch || AST || align=right | 1.4 km || 
|-id=196 bgcolor=#E9E9E9
| 349196 ||  || — || September 9, 2007 || Kitt Peak || Spacewatch || — || align=right | 1.9 km || 
|-id=197 bgcolor=#fefefe
| 349197 ||  || — || September 10, 2007 || Kitt Peak || Spacewatch || — || align=right | 1.0 km || 
|-id=198 bgcolor=#E9E9E9
| 349198 ||  || — || September 11, 2007 || Catalina || CSS || — || align=right | 3.6 km || 
|-id=199 bgcolor=#E9E9E9
| 349199 ||  || — || September 10, 2007 || Mount Lemmon || Mount Lemmon Survey || — || align=right | 1.6 km || 
|-id=200 bgcolor=#fefefe
| 349200 ||  || — || September 5, 2007 || Anderson Mesa || LONEOS || — || align=right data-sort-value="0.68" | 680 m || 
|}

349201–349300 

|-bgcolor=#E9E9E9
| 349201 ||  || — || September 14, 2007 || Catalina || CSS || — || align=right | 3.4 km || 
|-id=202 bgcolor=#E9E9E9
| 349202 ||  || — || September 12, 2007 || Catalina || CSS || — || align=right | 3.1 km || 
|-id=203 bgcolor=#E9E9E9
| 349203 ||  || — || September 13, 2007 || Catalina || CSS || JUN || align=right | 1.3 km || 
|-id=204 bgcolor=#fefefe
| 349204 ||  || — || September 14, 2007 || Catalina || CSS || V || align=right data-sort-value="0.83" | 830 m || 
|-id=205 bgcolor=#E9E9E9
| 349205 ||  || — || September 14, 2007 || Kitt Peak || Spacewatch || — || align=right | 1.6 km || 
|-id=206 bgcolor=#E9E9E9
| 349206 ||  || — || September 15, 2007 || Kitt Peak || Spacewatch || INO || align=right | 1.0 km || 
|-id=207 bgcolor=#E9E9E9
| 349207 ||  || — || September 15, 2007 || Kitt Peak || Spacewatch || — || align=right | 2.4 km || 
|-id=208 bgcolor=#E9E9E9
| 349208 ||  || — || September 5, 2007 || Siding Spring || SSS || MAR || align=right | 1.4 km || 
|-id=209 bgcolor=#E9E9E9
| 349209 ||  || — || September 13, 2007 || Catalina || CSS || — || align=right | 2.4 km || 
|-id=210 bgcolor=#E9E9E9
| 349210 ||  || — || September 13, 2007 || Catalina || CSS || — || align=right | 1.5 km || 
|-id=211 bgcolor=#E9E9E9
| 349211 ||  || — || September 13, 2007 || Kitt Peak || Spacewatch || HOF || align=right | 2.3 km || 
|-id=212 bgcolor=#d6d6d6
| 349212 ||  || — || September 14, 2007 || Mount Lemmon || Mount Lemmon Survey || — || align=right | 2.2 km || 
|-id=213 bgcolor=#d6d6d6
| 349213 ||  || — || September 10, 2007 || Mount Lemmon || Mount Lemmon Survey || — || align=right | 2.5 km || 
|-id=214 bgcolor=#E9E9E9
| 349214 ||  || — || September 11, 2007 || Kitt Peak || Spacewatch || — || align=right | 2.0 km || 
|-id=215 bgcolor=#E9E9E9
| 349215 ||  || — || September 12, 2007 || Catalina || CSS || NEM || align=right | 2.5 km || 
|-id=216 bgcolor=#E9E9E9
| 349216 ||  || — || September 13, 2007 || Catalina || CSS || JUN || align=right | 1.2 km || 
|-id=217 bgcolor=#E9E9E9
| 349217 ||  || — || May 10, 2002 || Palomar || NEAT || — || align=right | 1.9 km || 
|-id=218 bgcolor=#E9E9E9
| 349218 ||  || — || September 13, 2007 || Anderson Mesa || LONEOS || — || align=right | 2.3 km || 
|-id=219 bgcolor=#FFC2E0
| 349219 ||  || — || September 27, 2007 || Mount Lemmon || Mount Lemmon Survey || APO +1km || align=right data-sort-value="0.58" | 580 m || 
|-id=220 bgcolor=#d6d6d6
| 349220 ||  || — || September 19, 2007 || Kitt Peak || Spacewatch || HYG || align=right | 3.5 km || 
|-id=221 bgcolor=#E9E9E9
| 349221 ||  || — || September 30, 2007 || Kitt Peak || Spacewatch || — || align=right | 1.8 km || 
|-id=222 bgcolor=#E9E9E9
| 349222 ||  || — || October 2, 2007 || Antares || ARO || — || align=right | 1.7 km || 
|-id=223 bgcolor=#E9E9E9
| 349223 ||  || — || November 18, 2003 || Kitt Peak || Spacewatch || — || align=right data-sort-value="0.97" | 970 m || 
|-id=224 bgcolor=#E9E9E9
| 349224 ||  || — || September 12, 2007 || Mount Lemmon || Mount Lemmon Survey || — || align=right | 1.5 km || 
|-id=225 bgcolor=#E9E9E9
| 349225 ||  || — || October 7, 2007 || Altschwendt || W. Ries || HEN || align=right data-sort-value="0.92" | 920 m || 
|-id=226 bgcolor=#E9E9E9
| 349226 ||  || — || October 8, 2007 || Kitt Peak || Spacewatch || ADE || align=right | 3.7 km || 
|-id=227 bgcolor=#E9E9E9
| 349227 ||  || — || October 4, 2007 || Kitt Peak || Spacewatch || — || align=right | 2.1 km || 
|-id=228 bgcolor=#E9E9E9
| 349228 ||  || — || October 4, 2007 || Kitt Peak || Spacewatch || HNA || align=right | 2.4 km || 
|-id=229 bgcolor=#d6d6d6
| 349229 ||  || — || October 4, 2007 || Kitt Peak || Spacewatch || — || align=right | 3.5 km || 
|-id=230 bgcolor=#E9E9E9
| 349230 ||  || — || October 5, 2007 || Siding Spring || SSS || EUN || align=right | 1.5 km || 
|-id=231 bgcolor=#E9E9E9
| 349231 ||  || — || October 6, 2007 || Kitt Peak || Spacewatch || — || align=right | 3.6 km || 
|-id=232 bgcolor=#E9E9E9
| 349232 ||  || — || October 6, 2007 || Kitt Peak || Spacewatch || — || align=right | 2.6 km || 
|-id=233 bgcolor=#E9E9E9
| 349233 ||  || — || October 7, 2007 || Mount Lemmon || Mount Lemmon Survey || WIT || align=right | 1.2 km || 
|-id=234 bgcolor=#E9E9E9
| 349234 ||  || — || October 7, 2007 || Catalina || CSS || — || align=right | 2.6 km || 
|-id=235 bgcolor=#E9E9E9
| 349235 ||  || — || October 4, 2007 || Kitt Peak || Spacewatch || — || align=right | 1.9 km || 
|-id=236 bgcolor=#E9E9E9
| 349236 ||  || — || October 4, 2007 || Kitt Peak || Spacewatch || — || align=right | 1.5 km || 
|-id=237 bgcolor=#E9E9E9
| 349237 Quaglietti ||  ||  || October 13, 2007 || Vallemare di Borbona || V. S. Casulli || AGN || align=right | 1.2 km || 
|-id=238 bgcolor=#d6d6d6
| 349238 ||  || — || October 5, 2007 || Kitt Peak || Spacewatch || HYG || align=right | 3.1 km || 
|-id=239 bgcolor=#E9E9E9
| 349239 ||  || — || October 8, 2007 || Catalina || CSS || — || align=right | 2.6 km || 
|-id=240 bgcolor=#E9E9E9
| 349240 ||  || — || October 8, 2007 || Mount Lemmon || Mount Lemmon Survey || — || align=right | 2.7 km || 
|-id=241 bgcolor=#E9E9E9
| 349241 ||  || — || October 8, 2007 || Mount Lemmon || Mount Lemmon Survey || — || align=right | 1.7 km || 
|-id=242 bgcolor=#E9E9E9
| 349242 ||  || — || October 4, 2007 || Purple Mountain || PMO NEO || — || align=right | 3.6 km || 
|-id=243 bgcolor=#E9E9E9
| 349243 ||  || — || March 13, 2005 || Kitt Peak || Spacewatch || AGN || align=right | 1.4 km || 
|-id=244 bgcolor=#E9E9E9
| 349244 ||  || — || October 7, 2007 || Catalina || CSS || — || align=right | 3.2 km || 
|-id=245 bgcolor=#E9E9E9
| 349245 ||  || — || October 8, 2007 || Catalina || CSS || — || align=right | 2.5 km || 
|-id=246 bgcolor=#E9E9E9
| 349246 ||  || — || October 8, 2007 || Catalina || CSS || — || align=right | 2.1 km || 
|-id=247 bgcolor=#E9E9E9
| 349247 ||  || — || October 8, 2007 || Anderson Mesa || LONEOS || — || align=right | 2.9 km || 
|-id=248 bgcolor=#E9E9E9
| 349248 ||  || — || October 8, 2007 || Anderson Mesa || LONEOS || — || align=right | 1.9 km || 
|-id=249 bgcolor=#fefefe
| 349249 ||  || — || October 5, 2007 || Kitt Peak || Spacewatch || V || align=right data-sort-value="0.72" | 720 m || 
|-id=250 bgcolor=#E9E9E9
| 349250 ||  || — || October 6, 2007 || Kitt Peak || Spacewatch || — || align=right | 2.4 km || 
|-id=251 bgcolor=#E9E9E9
| 349251 ||  || — || October 6, 2007 || Kitt Peak || Spacewatch || AGN || align=right | 1.7 km || 
|-id=252 bgcolor=#d6d6d6
| 349252 ||  || — || October 6, 2007 || Kitt Peak || Spacewatch || — || align=right | 2.6 km || 
|-id=253 bgcolor=#fefefe
| 349253 ||  || — || October 7, 2007 || Kitt Peak || Spacewatch || — || align=right data-sort-value="0.72" | 720 m || 
|-id=254 bgcolor=#E9E9E9
| 349254 ||  || — || October 9, 2007 || Catalina || CSS || — || align=right | 2.6 km || 
|-id=255 bgcolor=#E9E9E9
| 349255 ||  || — || October 9, 2007 || Socorro || LINEAR || HNS || align=right | 1.5 km || 
|-id=256 bgcolor=#E9E9E9
| 349256 ||  || — || October 9, 2007 || Socorro || LINEAR || — || align=right | 2.1 km || 
|-id=257 bgcolor=#E9E9E9
| 349257 ||  || — || October 9, 2007 || Socorro || LINEAR || — || align=right | 2.5 km || 
|-id=258 bgcolor=#d6d6d6
| 349258 ||  || — || October 9, 2007 || Socorro || LINEAR || — || align=right | 3.6 km || 
|-id=259 bgcolor=#E9E9E9
| 349259 ||  || — || October 12, 2007 || Socorro || LINEAR || — || align=right | 3.2 km || 
|-id=260 bgcolor=#d6d6d6
| 349260 ||  || — || October 4, 2007 || Kitt Peak || Spacewatch || — || align=right | 2.8 km || 
|-id=261 bgcolor=#d6d6d6
| 349261 ||  || — || October 8, 2007 || Kitt Peak || Spacewatch || KAR || align=right | 1.1 km || 
|-id=262 bgcolor=#E9E9E9
| 349262 ||  || — || October 9, 2007 || Purple Mountain || PMO NEO || — || align=right | 3.1 km || 
|-id=263 bgcolor=#E9E9E9
| 349263 ||  || — || October 14, 2007 || Goodricke-Pigott || R. A. Tucker || — || align=right | 1.9 km || 
|-id=264 bgcolor=#E9E9E9
| 349264 ||  || — || October 4, 2007 || Catalina || CSS || MRX || align=right | 1.3 km || 
|-id=265 bgcolor=#E9E9E9
| 349265 ||  || — || October 8, 2007 || Mount Lemmon || Mount Lemmon Survey || MAR || align=right | 1.2 km || 
|-id=266 bgcolor=#E9E9E9
| 349266 ||  || — || October 8, 2007 || Mount Lemmon || Mount Lemmon Survey || HEN || align=right data-sort-value="0.99" | 990 m || 
|-id=267 bgcolor=#E9E9E9
| 349267 ||  || — || October 10, 2007 || Mount Lemmon || Mount Lemmon Survey || — || align=right | 2.2 km || 
|-id=268 bgcolor=#E9E9E9
| 349268 ||  || — || October 7, 2007 || Kitt Peak || Spacewatch || MRX || align=right | 1.2 km || 
|-id=269 bgcolor=#E9E9E9
| 349269 ||  || — || September 11, 2007 || Mount Lemmon || Mount Lemmon Survey || HOF || align=right | 2.6 km || 
|-id=270 bgcolor=#E9E9E9
| 349270 ||  || — || October 8, 2007 || Kitt Peak || Spacewatch || HEN || align=right data-sort-value="0.97" | 970 m || 
|-id=271 bgcolor=#E9E9E9
| 349271 ||  || — || October 8, 2007 || Kitt Peak || Spacewatch || WIT || align=right | 1.4 km || 
|-id=272 bgcolor=#E9E9E9
| 349272 ||  || — || October 12, 2007 || Kitt Peak || Spacewatch || — || align=right | 2.5 km || 
|-id=273 bgcolor=#fefefe
| 349273 ||  || — || October 9, 2007 || Kitt Peak || Spacewatch || FLO || align=right data-sort-value="0.57" | 570 m || 
|-id=274 bgcolor=#E9E9E9
| 349274 ||  || — || October 12, 2007 || Catalina || CSS || CLO || align=right | 2.9 km || 
|-id=275 bgcolor=#d6d6d6
| 349275 ||  || — || September 14, 2007 || Mount Lemmon || Mount Lemmon Survey || — || align=right | 3.0 km || 
|-id=276 bgcolor=#E9E9E9
| 349276 ||  || — || October 11, 2007 || Kitt Peak || Spacewatch || HOF || align=right | 2.6 km || 
|-id=277 bgcolor=#E9E9E9
| 349277 ||  || — || October 12, 2007 || Kitt Peak || Spacewatch || — || align=right | 2.2 km || 
|-id=278 bgcolor=#E9E9E9
| 349278 ||  || — || September 25, 2007 || Mount Lemmon || Mount Lemmon Survey || — || align=right | 1.6 km || 
|-id=279 bgcolor=#E9E9E9
| 349279 ||  || — || October 11, 2007 || Kitt Peak || Spacewatch || — || align=right data-sort-value="0.82" | 820 m || 
|-id=280 bgcolor=#d6d6d6
| 349280 ||  || — || September 18, 2007 || Mount Lemmon || Mount Lemmon Survey || THM || align=right | 2.0 km || 
|-id=281 bgcolor=#E9E9E9
| 349281 ||  || — || October 15, 2007 || Kitt Peak || Spacewatch || — || align=right | 1.9 km || 
|-id=282 bgcolor=#E9E9E9
| 349282 ||  || — || September 9, 2007 || Kitt Peak || Spacewatch || — || align=right | 1.8 km || 
|-id=283 bgcolor=#E9E9E9
| 349283 ||  || — || October 14, 2007 || Mount Lemmon || Mount Lemmon Survey || — || align=right | 2.3 km || 
|-id=284 bgcolor=#E9E9E9
| 349284 ||  || — || September 10, 2007 || Mount Lemmon || Mount Lemmon Survey || JUN || align=right | 1.1 km || 
|-id=285 bgcolor=#E9E9E9
| 349285 ||  || — || October 9, 2007 || Catalina || CSS || EUN || align=right | 1.5 km || 
|-id=286 bgcolor=#E9E9E9
| 349286 ||  || — || March 9, 2005 || Mount Lemmon || Mount Lemmon Survey || — || align=right | 2.9 km || 
|-id=287 bgcolor=#E9E9E9
| 349287 ||  || — || October 14, 2007 || Mount Lemmon || Mount Lemmon Survey || — || align=right | 2.1 km || 
|-id=288 bgcolor=#E9E9E9
| 349288 ||  || — || October 11, 2007 || Kitt Peak || Spacewatch || — || align=right | 1.9 km || 
|-id=289 bgcolor=#E9E9E9
| 349289 ||  || — || October 14, 2007 || Kitt Peak || Spacewatch || — || align=right | 2.7 km || 
|-id=290 bgcolor=#E9E9E9
| 349290 ||  || — || October 15, 2007 || Catalina || CSS || — || align=right | 3.5 km || 
|-id=291 bgcolor=#E9E9E9
| 349291 ||  || — || October 13, 2007 || Kitt Peak || Spacewatch || — || align=right data-sort-value="0.90" | 900 m || 
|-id=292 bgcolor=#d6d6d6
| 349292 ||  || — || September 10, 2007 || Mount Lemmon || Mount Lemmon Survey || EOS || align=right | 2.0 km || 
|-id=293 bgcolor=#d6d6d6
| 349293 ||  || — || October 13, 2007 || Anderson Mesa || LONEOS || — || align=right | 4.1 km || 
|-id=294 bgcolor=#E9E9E9
| 349294 ||  || — || October 8, 2007 || Mount Lemmon || Mount Lemmon Survey || PAD || align=right | 1.7 km || 
|-id=295 bgcolor=#d6d6d6
| 349295 ||  || — || October 9, 2007 || Kitt Peak || Spacewatch || CHA || align=right | 2.0 km || 
|-id=296 bgcolor=#E9E9E9
| 349296 ||  || — || October 9, 2007 || Mount Lemmon || Mount Lemmon Survey || AER || align=right | 1.4 km || 
|-id=297 bgcolor=#E9E9E9
| 349297 ||  || — || October 14, 2007 || Socorro || LINEAR || EUN || align=right | 1.5 km || 
|-id=298 bgcolor=#E9E9E9
| 349298 ||  || — || October 14, 2007 || Goodricke-Pigott || R. A. Tucker || — || align=right | 3.1 km || 
|-id=299 bgcolor=#d6d6d6
| 349299 ||  || — || October 5, 2007 || Kitt Peak || Spacewatch || — || align=right | 3.4 km || 
|-id=300 bgcolor=#d6d6d6
| 349300 ||  || — || February 16, 2004 || Kitt Peak || Spacewatch || — || align=right | 2.7 km || 
|}

349301–349400 

|-bgcolor=#E9E9E9
| 349301 ||  || — || October 12, 2007 || Catalina || CSS || — || align=right | 2.2 km || 
|-id=302 bgcolor=#E9E9E9
| 349302 ||  || — || October 17, 2007 || Anderson Mesa || LONEOS || — || align=right | 3.0 km || 
|-id=303 bgcolor=#E9E9E9
| 349303 ||  || — || October 17, 2007 || Anderson Mesa || LONEOS || — || align=right | 3.5 km || 
|-id=304 bgcolor=#E9E9E9
| 349304 ||  || — || October 17, 2007 || Anderson Mesa || LONEOS || — || align=right | 2.9 km || 
|-id=305 bgcolor=#E9E9E9
| 349305 ||  || — || October 19, 2007 || Catalina || CSS || — || align=right | 2.7 km || 
|-id=306 bgcolor=#d6d6d6
| 349306 ||  || — || October 16, 2007 || Kitt Peak || Spacewatch || K-2 || align=right | 1.5 km || 
|-id=307 bgcolor=#d6d6d6
| 349307 ||  || — || October 16, 2007 || Kitt Peak || Spacewatch || EUP || align=right | 6.1 km || 
|-id=308 bgcolor=#d6d6d6
| 349308 ||  || — || October 19, 2007 || Kitt Peak || Spacewatch || VER || align=right | 3.5 km || 
|-id=309 bgcolor=#E9E9E9
| 349309 ||  || — || October 20, 2007 || Catalina || CSS || — || align=right | 2.5 km || 
|-id=310 bgcolor=#d6d6d6
| 349310 ||  || — || October 30, 2007 || Kitt Peak || Spacewatch || — || align=right | 2.8 km || 
|-id=311 bgcolor=#E9E9E9
| 349311 ||  || — || October 30, 2007 || Mount Lemmon || Mount Lemmon Survey || — || align=right | 2.6 km || 
|-id=312 bgcolor=#d6d6d6
| 349312 ||  || — || October 30, 2007 || Mount Lemmon || Mount Lemmon Survey || KOR || align=right | 1.4 km || 
|-id=313 bgcolor=#d6d6d6
| 349313 ||  || — || October 30, 2007 || Kitt Peak || Spacewatch || — || align=right | 3.7 km || 
|-id=314 bgcolor=#E9E9E9
| 349314 ||  || — || October 30, 2007 || Kitt Peak || Spacewatch || HOF || align=right | 2.5 km || 
|-id=315 bgcolor=#d6d6d6
| 349315 ||  || — || October 30, 2007 || Mount Lemmon || Mount Lemmon Survey || — || align=right | 2.1 km || 
|-id=316 bgcolor=#E9E9E9
| 349316 ||  || — || October 31, 2007 || Mount Lemmon || Mount Lemmon Survey || — || align=right | 2.1 km || 
|-id=317 bgcolor=#d6d6d6
| 349317 ||  || — || October 30, 2007 || Kitt Peak || Spacewatch || KOR || align=right | 1.6 km || 
|-id=318 bgcolor=#fefefe
| 349318 ||  || — || October 30, 2007 || Kitt Peak || Spacewatch || — || align=right data-sort-value="0.91" | 910 m || 
|-id=319 bgcolor=#E9E9E9
| 349319 ||  || — || October 30, 2007 || Mount Lemmon || Mount Lemmon Survey || — || align=right | 2.2 km || 
|-id=320 bgcolor=#E9E9E9
| 349320 ||  || — || October 30, 2007 || Kitt Peak || Spacewatch || HEN || align=right | 1.5 km || 
|-id=321 bgcolor=#d6d6d6
| 349321 ||  || — || October 30, 2007 || Kitt Peak || Spacewatch || KAR || align=right | 1.2 km || 
|-id=322 bgcolor=#E9E9E9
| 349322 ||  || — || October 30, 2007 || Mount Lemmon || Mount Lemmon Survey || — || align=right | 2.3 km || 
|-id=323 bgcolor=#E9E9E9
| 349323 ||  || — || October 31, 2007 || Kitt Peak || Spacewatch || GEF || align=right | 1.3 km || 
|-id=324 bgcolor=#d6d6d6
| 349324 ||  || — || October 30, 2007 || Kitt Peak || Spacewatch || CHA || align=right | 2.1 km || 
|-id=325 bgcolor=#d6d6d6
| 349325 ||  || — || October 20, 2007 || Mount Lemmon || Mount Lemmon Survey || KOR || align=right | 1.3 km || 
|-id=326 bgcolor=#d6d6d6
| 349326 ||  || — || October 26, 2007 || Mount Lemmon || Mount Lemmon Survey || — || align=right | 3.8 km || 
|-id=327 bgcolor=#E9E9E9
| 349327 || 2007 VJ || — || November 1, 2007 || Eskridge || G. Hug || — || align=right | 2.2 km || 
|-id=328 bgcolor=#E9E9E9
| 349328 ||  || — || November 1, 2007 || Pla D'Arguines || R. Ferrando || — || align=right | 1.9 km || 
|-id=329 bgcolor=#E9E9E9
| 349329 ||  || — || November 4, 2007 || La Sagra || OAM Obs. || — || align=right | 1.3 km || 
|-id=330 bgcolor=#E9E9E9
| 349330 ||  || — || November 2, 2007 || Eskridge || G. Hug || — || align=right | 3.0 km || 
|-id=331 bgcolor=#E9E9E9
| 349331 ||  || — || October 20, 2007 || Mount Lemmon || Mount Lemmon Survey || MAR || align=right | 1.6 km || 
|-id=332 bgcolor=#d6d6d6
| 349332 ||  || — || November 2, 2007 || Kitt Peak || Spacewatch || KAR || align=right data-sort-value="0.96" | 960 m || 
|-id=333 bgcolor=#d6d6d6
| 349333 ||  || — || November 4, 2007 || Mount Lemmon || Mount Lemmon Survey || — || align=right | 3.3 km || 
|-id=334 bgcolor=#d6d6d6
| 349334 ||  || — || November 1, 2007 || Kitt Peak || Spacewatch || — || align=right | 2.5 km || 
|-id=335 bgcolor=#d6d6d6
| 349335 ||  || — || November 1, 2007 || Kitt Peak || Spacewatch || — || align=right | 3.0 km || 
|-id=336 bgcolor=#d6d6d6
| 349336 ||  || — || November 1, 2007 || Kitt Peak || Spacewatch || EOS || align=right | 2.4 km || 
|-id=337 bgcolor=#E9E9E9
| 349337 ||  || — || November 1, 2007 || Kitt Peak || Spacewatch || — || align=right | 1.6 km || 
|-id=338 bgcolor=#E9E9E9
| 349338 ||  || — || November 1, 2007 || Kitt Peak || Spacewatch || HOF || align=right | 2.6 km || 
|-id=339 bgcolor=#d6d6d6
| 349339 ||  || — || November 3, 2007 || Kitt Peak || Spacewatch || KOR || align=right | 1.3 km || 
|-id=340 bgcolor=#E9E9E9
| 349340 ||  || — || November 4, 2007 || Kitt Peak || Spacewatch || HOF || align=right | 2.3 km || 
|-id=341 bgcolor=#E9E9E9
| 349341 ||  || — || October 5, 2002 || Palomar || NEAT || — || align=right | 2.3 km || 
|-id=342 bgcolor=#d6d6d6
| 349342 ||  || — || November 2, 2007 || Socorro || LINEAR || — || align=right | 5.1 km || 
|-id=343 bgcolor=#d6d6d6
| 349343 ||  || — || October 19, 2007 || Catalina || CSS || — || align=right | 4.2 km || 
|-id=344 bgcolor=#d6d6d6
| 349344 ||  || — || November 8, 2007 || Socorro || LINEAR || BRA || align=right | 1.9 km || 
|-id=345 bgcolor=#d6d6d6
| 349345 ||  || — || May 8, 2005 || Mount Lemmon || Mount Lemmon Survey || — || align=right | 2.9 km || 
|-id=346 bgcolor=#d6d6d6
| 349346 ||  || — || September 10, 2007 || Mount Lemmon || Mount Lemmon Survey || — || align=right | 2.7 km || 
|-id=347 bgcolor=#E9E9E9
| 349347 ||  || — || November 3, 2007 || Kitt Peak || Spacewatch || MRX || align=right | 1.1 km || 
|-id=348 bgcolor=#d6d6d6
| 349348 ||  || — || November 4, 2007 || Kitt Peak || Spacewatch || KAR || align=right | 1.1 km || 
|-id=349 bgcolor=#d6d6d6
| 349349 ||  || — || November 4, 2007 || Mount Lemmon || Mount Lemmon Survey || EUP || align=right | 5.6 km || 
|-id=350 bgcolor=#E9E9E9
| 349350 ||  || — || November 5, 2007 || Kitt Peak || Spacewatch || AST || align=right | 1.7 km || 
|-id=351 bgcolor=#d6d6d6
| 349351 ||  || — || November 5, 2007 || Kitt Peak || Spacewatch || KOR || align=right | 1.2 km || 
|-id=352 bgcolor=#d6d6d6
| 349352 ||  || — || November 5, 2007 || Mount Lemmon || Mount Lemmon Survey || EOS || align=right | 2.0 km || 
|-id=353 bgcolor=#E9E9E9
| 349353 ||  || — || November 1, 2007 || Mount Lemmon || Mount Lemmon Survey || HOF || align=right | 2.1 km || 
|-id=354 bgcolor=#d6d6d6
| 349354 ||  || — || November 4, 2007 || Mount Lemmon || Mount Lemmon Survey || — || align=right | 2.7 km || 
|-id=355 bgcolor=#d6d6d6
| 349355 ||  || — || November 4, 2007 || Kitt Peak || Spacewatch || CHA || align=right | 2.5 km || 
|-id=356 bgcolor=#E9E9E9
| 349356 ||  || — || November 4, 2007 || Kitt Peak || Spacewatch || AGN || align=right | 1.1 km || 
|-id=357 bgcolor=#d6d6d6
| 349357 ||  || — || November 5, 2007 || Purple Mountain || PMO NEO || EOS || align=right | 2.3 km || 
|-id=358 bgcolor=#d6d6d6
| 349358 ||  || — || November 8, 2007 || Mount Lemmon || Mount Lemmon Survey || — || align=right | 4.1 km || 
|-id=359 bgcolor=#E9E9E9
| 349359 ||  || — || November 14, 2007 || Bisei SG Center || BATTeRS || GEF || align=right | 1.7 km || 
|-id=360 bgcolor=#E9E9E9
| 349360 ||  || — || October 31, 2007 || Kitt Peak || Spacewatch || WIT || align=right | 1.2 km || 
|-id=361 bgcolor=#d6d6d6
| 349361 ||  || — || November 4, 2007 || Mount Lemmon || Mount Lemmon Survey || — || align=right | 5.3 km || 
|-id=362 bgcolor=#d6d6d6
| 349362 ||  || — || October 15, 2007 || Mount Lemmon || Mount Lemmon Survey || — || align=right | 2.6 km || 
|-id=363 bgcolor=#E9E9E9
| 349363 ||  || — || November 9, 2007 || Catalina || CSS || — || align=right | 3.2 km || 
|-id=364 bgcolor=#d6d6d6
| 349364 ||  || — || November 7, 2007 || Kitt Peak || Spacewatch || LAU || align=right | 1.0 km || 
|-id=365 bgcolor=#E9E9E9
| 349365 ||  || — || November 7, 2007 || Catalina || CSS || — || align=right | 2.8 km || 
|-id=366 bgcolor=#FA8072
| 349366 ||  || — || November 11, 2007 || Purple Mountain || PMO NEO || — || align=right | 1.0 km || 
|-id=367 bgcolor=#d6d6d6
| 349367 ||  || — || November 9, 2007 || Kitt Peak || Spacewatch || KOR || align=right | 1.4 km || 
|-id=368 bgcolor=#E9E9E9
| 349368 ||  || — || November 12, 2007 || Marly || P. Kocher || MIS || align=right | 2.8 km || 
|-id=369 bgcolor=#E9E9E9
| 349369 ||  || — || November 11, 2007 || Mount Lemmon || Mount Lemmon Survey || — || align=right | 2.8 km || 
|-id=370 bgcolor=#E9E9E9
| 349370 ||  || — || November 13, 2007 || Mount Lemmon || Mount Lemmon Survey || — || align=right | 2.6 km || 
|-id=371 bgcolor=#d6d6d6
| 349371 ||  || — || November 14, 2007 || Kitt Peak || Spacewatch || KOR || align=right | 1.6 km || 
|-id=372 bgcolor=#E9E9E9
| 349372 ||  || — || November 15, 2007 || Catalina || CSS || — || align=right | 3.2 km || 
|-id=373 bgcolor=#E9E9E9
| 349373 ||  || — || November 4, 2007 || Catalina || CSS || HNS || align=right | 1.6 km || 
|-id=374 bgcolor=#d6d6d6
| 349374 ||  || — || November 3, 2007 || Mount Lemmon || Mount Lemmon Survey || EOS || align=right | 2.5 km || 
|-id=375 bgcolor=#d6d6d6
| 349375 ||  || — || November 4, 2007 || Mount Lemmon || Mount Lemmon Survey || — || align=right | 2.6 km || 
|-id=376 bgcolor=#d6d6d6
| 349376 ||  || — || November 7, 2007 || Mount Lemmon || Mount Lemmon Survey || — || align=right | 3.8 km || 
|-id=377 bgcolor=#E9E9E9
| 349377 ||  || — || November 2, 2007 || Socorro || LINEAR || — || align=right | 2.9 km || 
|-id=378 bgcolor=#d6d6d6
| 349378 ||  || — || November 3, 2007 || Kitt Peak || Spacewatch || — || align=right | 2.8 km || 
|-id=379 bgcolor=#E9E9E9
| 349379 ||  || — || November 17, 2007 || Costitx || OAM Obs. || JUN || align=right | 1.7 km || 
|-id=380 bgcolor=#E9E9E9
| 349380 ||  || — || November 17, 2007 || Socorro || LINEAR || — || align=right | 3.0 km || 
|-id=381 bgcolor=#E9E9E9
| 349381 ||  || — || November 17, 2007 || Mount Lemmon || Mount Lemmon Survey || — || align=right | 2.0 km || 
|-id=382 bgcolor=#d6d6d6
| 349382 ||  || — || November 4, 2007 || Kitt Peak || Spacewatch || — || align=right | 2.9 km || 
|-id=383 bgcolor=#E9E9E9
| 349383 ||  || — || October 12, 2007 || Mount Lemmon || Mount Lemmon Survey || — || align=right | 2.5 km || 
|-id=384 bgcolor=#d6d6d6
| 349384 ||  || — || November 20, 2007 || Mount Lemmon || Mount Lemmon Survey || KAR || align=right | 1.0 km || 
|-id=385 bgcolor=#E9E9E9
| 349385 ||  || — || November 29, 2007 || Lulin || LUSS || EUN || align=right | 1.7 km || 
|-id=386 bgcolor=#d6d6d6
| 349386 Randywright ||  ||  || November 30, 2007 || Charleston || R. Holmes || — || align=right | 2.7 km || 
|-id=387 bgcolor=#d6d6d6
| 349387 ||  || — || November 16, 2007 || Socorro || LINEAR || 615 || align=right | 1.9 km || 
|-id=388 bgcolor=#E9E9E9
| 349388 ||  || — || November 17, 2007 || Mount Lemmon || Mount Lemmon Survey || — || align=right | 3.0 km || 
|-id=389 bgcolor=#d6d6d6
| 349389 ||  || — || December 3, 2007 || Kitt Peak || Spacewatch || EOS || align=right | 2.2 km || 
|-id=390 bgcolor=#E9E9E9
| 349390 ||  || — || December 8, 2007 || La Sagra || OAM Obs. || — || align=right | 2.9 km || 
|-id=391 bgcolor=#d6d6d6
| 349391 ||  || — || December 12, 2007 || La Sagra || OAM Obs. || — || align=right | 3.7 km || 
|-id=392 bgcolor=#d6d6d6
| 349392 ||  || — || April 19, 2004 || Kitt Peak || Spacewatch || — || align=right | 2.3 km || 
|-id=393 bgcolor=#d6d6d6
| 349393 ||  || — || December 31, 2002 || Socorro || LINEAR || — || align=right | 3.3 km || 
|-id=394 bgcolor=#d6d6d6
| 349394 ||  || — || December 13, 2007 || Socorro || LINEAR || — || align=right | 3.8 km || 
|-id=395 bgcolor=#d6d6d6
| 349395 ||  || — || November 2, 2007 || Kitt Peak || Spacewatch || — || align=right | 3.5 km || 
|-id=396 bgcolor=#d6d6d6
| 349396 ||  || — || December 4, 2007 || Mount Lemmon || Mount Lemmon Survey || — || align=right | 3.5 km || 
|-id=397 bgcolor=#d6d6d6
| 349397 ||  || — || December 6, 2007 || Mount Lemmon || Mount Lemmon Survey || — || align=right | 3.5 km || 
|-id=398 bgcolor=#d6d6d6
| 349398 ||  || — || December 4, 2007 || Mount Lemmon || Mount Lemmon Survey || — || align=right | 3.0 km || 
|-id=399 bgcolor=#d6d6d6
| 349399 ||  || — || December 2, 2007 || Socorro || LINEAR || EUP || align=right | 4.6 km || 
|-id=400 bgcolor=#d6d6d6
| 349400 ||  || — || December 17, 2007 || Piszkéstető || K. Sárneczky || — || align=right | 3.4 km || 
|}

349401–349500 

|-bgcolor=#d6d6d6
| 349401 ||  || — || December 17, 2007 || Mount Lemmon || Mount Lemmon Survey || — || align=right | 2.9 km || 
|-id=402 bgcolor=#d6d6d6
| 349402 ||  || — || December 17, 2007 || Mount Lemmon || Mount Lemmon Survey || TIR || align=right | 3.6 km || 
|-id=403 bgcolor=#FA8072
| 349403 ||  || — || December 17, 2007 || Mount Lemmon || Mount Lemmon Survey || H || align=right data-sort-value="0.82" | 820 m || 
|-id=404 bgcolor=#d6d6d6
| 349404 ||  || — || December 17, 2007 || Mount Lemmon || Mount Lemmon Survey || — || align=right | 3.9 km || 
|-id=405 bgcolor=#d6d6d6
| 349405 ||  || — || December 18, 2007 || Mount Lemmon || Mount Lemmon Survey || — || align=right | 4.5 km || 
|-id=406 bgcolor=#d6d6d6
| 349406 ||  || — || December 18, 2007 || Kitt Peak || Spacewatch || EOS || align=right | 2.1 km || 
|-id=407 bgcolor=#d6d6d6
| 349407 Stefaniafoglia ||  ||  || December 29, 2007 || Suno || Suno Obs. || — || align=right | 4.2 km || 
|-id=408 bgcolor=#E9E9E9
| 349408 ||  || — || December 28, 2007 || Kitt Peak || Spacewatch || — || align=right | 3.1 km || 
|-id=409 bgcolor=#d6d6d6
| 349409 ||  || — || December 30, 2007 || Kitt Peak || Spacewatch || — || align=right | 3.3 km || 
|-id=410 bgcolor=#d6d6d6
| 349410 ||  || — || December 30, 2007 || Kitt Peak || Spacewatch || THM || align=right | 2.3 km || 
|-id=411 bgcolor=#d6d6d6
| 349411 ||  || — || December 28, 2007 || Kitt Peak || Spacewatch || — || align=right | 3.6 km || 
|-id=412 bgcolor=#d6d6d6
| 349412 ||  || — || December 28, 2007 || Kitt Peak || Spacewatch || — || align=right | 3.9 km || 
|-id=413 bgcolor=#d6d6d6
| 349413 ||  || — || December 31, 2007 || Catalina || CSS || — || align=right | 3.9 km || 
|-id=414 bgcolor=#d6d6d6
| 349414 ||  || — || December 30, 2007 || Catalina || CSS || — || align=right | 3.2 km || 
|-id=415 bgcolor=#d6d6d6
| 349415 ||  || — || December 30, 2007 || Kitt Peak || Spacewatch || — || align=right | 3.9 km || 
|-id=416 bgcolor=#d6d6d6
| 349416 ||  || — || November 4, 2007 || Kitt Peak || Spacewatch || — || align=right | 3.0 km || 
|-id=417 bgcolor=#E9E9E9
| 349417 ||  || — || January 10, 2008 || Mount Lemmon || Mount Lemmon Survey || — || align=right | 1.8 km || 
|-id=418 bgcolor=#d6d6d6
| 349418 ||  || — || January 10, 2008 || Mount Lemmon || Mount Lemmon Survey || EOS || align=right | 2.2 km || 
|-id=419 bgcolor=#d6d6d6
| 349419 ||  || — || January 10, 2008 || Mount Lemmon || Mount Lemmon Survey || — || align=right | 2.2 km || 
|-id=420 bgcolor=#d6d6d6
| 349420 ||  || — || January 10, 2008 || Catalina || CSS || TIR || align=right | 3.7 km || 
|-id=421 bgcolor=#d6d6d6
| 349421 ||  || — || January 10, 2008 || Mount Lemmon || Mount Lemmon Survey || HYG || align=right | 3.4 km || 
|-id=422 bgcolor=#d6d6d6
| 349422 ||  || — || January 5, 2008 || Purple Mountain || PMO NEO || — || align=right | 4.1 km || 
|-id=423 bgcolor=#d6d6d6
| 349423 ||  || — || January 10, 2008 || Kitt Peak || Spacewatch || — || align=right | 2.5 km || 
|-id=424 bgcolor=#fefefe
| 349424 ||  || — || January 10, 2008 || Catalina || CSS || H || align=right data-sort-value="0.82" | 820 m || 
|-id=425 bgcolor=#d6d6d6
| 349425 ||  || — || November 5, 2007 || Kitt Peak || Spacewatch || KOR || align=right | 1.5 km || 
|-id=426 bgcolor=#E9E9E9
| 349426 ||  || — || January 11, 2008 || Kitt Peak || Spacewatch || — || align=right | 2.1 km || 
|-id=427 bgcolor=#d6d6d6
| 349427 ||  || — || January 11, 2008 || Kitt Peak || Spacewatch || THM || align=right | 2.3 km || 
|-id=428 bgcolor=#d6d6d6
| 349428 ||  || — || January 11, 2008 || Kitt Peak || Spacewatch || VER || align=right | 3.1 km || 
|-id=429 bgcolor=#fefefe
| 349429 ||  || — || January 11, 2008 || Kitt Peak || Spacewatch || — || align=right data-sort-value="0.53" | 530 m || 
|-id=430 bgcolor=#d6d6d6
| 349430 ||  || — || January 10, 2008 || Catalina || CSS || — || align=right | 4.9 km || 
|-id=431 bgcolor=#d6d6d6
| 349431 ||  || — || January 13, 2008 || Kitt Peak || Spacewatch || TRP || align=right | 3.8 km || 
|-id=432 bgcolor=#fefefe
| 349432 ||  || — || January 15, 2008 || Kitt Peak || Spacewatch || — || align=right data-sort-value="0.83" | 830 m || 
|-id=433 bgcolor=#d6d6d6
| 349433 ||  || — || January 15, 2008 || Kitt Peak || Spacewatch || — || align=right | 3.3 km || 
|-id=434 bgcolor=#d6d6d6
| 349434 ||  || — || January 1, 2008 || Mount Lemmon || Mount Lemmon Survey || EOS || align=right | 2.2 km || 
|-id=435 bgcolor=#d6d6d6
| 349435 ||  || — || March 25, 2003 || Palomar || NEAT || — || align=right | 3.8 km || 
|-id=436 bgcolor=#d6d6d6
| 349436 ||  || — || January 11, 2008 || Catalina || CSS || — || align=right | 2.9 km || 
|-id=437 bgcolor=#d6d6d6
| 349437 ||  || — || October 16, 2006 || Catalina || CSS || — || align=right | 4.4 km || 
|-id=438 bgcolor=#d6d6d6
| 349438 ||  || — || January 16, 2008 || Mount Lemmon || Mount Lemmon Survey || — || align=right | 4.0 km || 
|-id=439 bgcolor=#d6d6d6
| 349439 ||  || — || January 16, 2008 || Mount Lemmon || Mount Lemmon Survey || ALA || align=right | 4.6 km || 
|-id=440 bgcolor=#FA8072
| 349440 ||  || — || January 19, 2008 || Mount Lemmon || Mount Lemmon Survey || H || align=right data-sort-value="0.83" | 830 m || 
|-id=441 bgcolor=#fefefe
| 349441 ||  || — || January 16, 2008 || Kitt Peak || Spacewatch || — || align=right data-sort-value="0.86" | 860 m || 
|-id=442 bgcolor=#d6d6d6
| 349442 ||  || — || January 31, 2008 || Mount Lemmon || Mount Lemmon Survey || HYG || align=right | 3.0 km || 
|-id=443 bgcolor=#fefefe
| 349443 ||  || — || January 30, 2008 || Catalina || CSS || H || align=right data-sort-value="0.82" | 820 m || 
|-id=444 bgcolor=#d6d6d6
| 349444 ||  || — || January 30, 2008 || Catalina || CSS || — || align=right | 3.2 km || 
|-id=445 bgcolor=#d6d6d6
| 349445 ||  || — || December 30, 2007 || Kitt Peak || Spacewatch || — || align=right | 2.2 km || 
|-id=446 bgcolor=#d6d6d6
| 349446 ||  || — || February 1, 2008 || La Sagra || OAM Obs. || — || align=right | 4.1 km || 
|-id=447 bgcolor=#d6d6d6
| 349447 ||  || — || February 2, 2008 || Catalina || CSS || — || align=right | 4.7 km || 
|-id=448 bgcolor=#d6d6d6
| 349448 ||  || — || January 11, 2008 || Lulin || Lulin Obs. || — || align=right | 3.0 km || 
|-id=449 bgcolor=#d6d6d6
| 349449 ||  || — || February 7, 2008 || Mount Lemmon || Mount Lemmon Survey || — || align=right | 4.0 km || 
|-id=450 bgcolor=#d6d6d6
| 349450 ||  || — || February 8, 2008 || Bergisch Gladbach || W. Bickel || EOS || align=right | 2.2 km || 
|-id=451 bgcolor=#d6d6d6
| 349451 ||  || — || February 8, 2008 || Mayhill || W. G. Dillon || — || align=right | 4.2 km || 
|-id=452 bgcolor=#d6d6d6
| 349452 ||  || — || February 6, 2008 || Catalina || CSS || — || align=right | 4.2 km || 
|-id=453 bgcolor=#d6d6d6
| 349453 ||  || — || February 3, 2008 || Kitt Peak || Spacewatch || TIR || align=right | 3.6 km || 
|-id=454 bgcolor=#d6d6d6
| 349454 ||  || — || February 7, 2008 || Kitt Peak || Spacewatch || — || align=right | 2.2 km || 
|-id=455 bgcolor=#d6d6d6
| 349455 ||  || — || February 7, 2008 || Kitt Peak || Spacewatch || — || align=right | 3.7 km || 
|-id=456 bgcolor=#d6d6d6
| 349456 ||  || — || February 8, 2008 || Mount Lemmon || Mount Lemmon Survey || HYG || align=right | 3.1 km || 
|-id=457 bgcolor=#d6d6d6
| 349457 ||  || — || August 31, 2005 || Kitt Peak || Spacewatch || HYG || align=right | 3.0 km || 
|-id=458 bgcolor=#d6d6d6
| 349458 ||  || — || February 11, 2008 || Dauban || F. Kugel || — || align=right | 2.0 km || 
|-id=459 bgcolor=#d6d6d6
| 349459 ||  || — || February 11, 2008 || Costitx || OAM Obs. || — || align=right | 3.2 km || 
|-id=460 bgcolor=#fefefe
| 349460 ||  || — || February 8, 2008 || Kitt Peak || Spacewatch || V || align=right data-sort-value="0.62" | 620 m || 
|-id=461 bgcolor=#d6d6d6
| 349461 ||  || — || February 8, 2008 || Mount Lemmon || Mount Lemmon Survey || — || align=right | 3.4 km || 
|-id=462 bgcolor=#d6d6d6
| 349462 ||  || — || February 8, 2008 || Mount Lemmon || Mount Lemmon Survey || — || align=right | 3.9 km || 
|-id=463 bgcolor=#d6d6d6
| 349463 ||  || — || February 8, 2008 || Mount Lemmon || Mount Lemmon Survey || — || align=right | 3.7 km || 
|-id=464 bgcolor=#d6d6d6
| 349464 ||  || — || February 8, 2008 || Kitt Peak || Spacewatch || — || align=right | 3.5 km || 
|-id=465 bgcolor=#d6d6d6
| 349465 ||  || — || February 9, 2008 || Kitt Peak || Spacewatch || — || align=right | 3.2 km || 
|-id=466 bgcolor=#d6d6d6
| 349466 ||  || — || February 10, 2008 || Catalina || CSS || LIX || align=right | 6.1 km || 
|-id=467 bgcolor=#E9E9E9
| 349467 ||  || — || February 11, 2008 || Mount Lemmon || Mount Lemmon Survey || MRX || align=right | 1.3 km || 
|-id=468 bgcolor=#d6d6d6
| 349468 ||  || — || February 6, 2008 || Socorro || LINEAR || — || align=right | 3.5 km || 
|-id=469 bgcolor=#d6d6d6
| 349469 ||  || — || February 6, 2008 || Socorro || LINEAR || — || align=right | 4.2 km || 
|-id=470 bgcolor=#d6d6d6
| 349470 ||  || — || February 9, 2008 || Siding Spring || SSS || EUP || align=right | 5.2 km || 
|-id=471 bgcolor=#d6d6d6
| 349471 ||  || — || February 10, 2008 || Catalina || CSS || — || align=right | 5.5 km || 
|-id=472 bgcolor=#d6d6d6
| 349472 ||  || — || July 6, 2005 || Kitt Peak || Spacewatch || — || align=right | 3.9 km || 
|-id=473 bgcolor=#d6d6d6
| 349473 ||  || — || February 11, 2008 || Socorro || LINEAR || — || align=right | 3.2 km || 
|-id=474 bgcolor=#d6d6d6
| 349474 ||  || — || January 11, 2008 || Kitt Peak || Spacewatch || EOS || align=right | 2.1 km || 
|-id=475 bgcolor=#d6d6d6
| 349475 ||  || — || February 25, 2008 || Kitt Peak || Spacewatch || — || align=right | 4.9 km || 
|-id=476 bgcolor=#d6d6d6
| 349476 ||  || — || February 26, 2008 || Mount Lemmon || Mount Lemmon Survey || VER || align=right | 3.5 km || 
|-id=477 bgcolor=#d6d6d6
| 349477 ||  || — || February 26, 2008 || Kitt Peak || Spacewatch || — || align=right | 3.3 km || 
|-id=478 bgcolor=#d6d6d6
| 349478 ||  || — || February 28, 2008 || Mount Lemmon || Mount Lemmon Survey || — || align=right | 3.4 km || 
|-id=479 bgcolor=#d6d6d6
| 349479 ||  || — || February 28, 2008 || Kitt Peak || Spacewatch || — || align=right | 2.0 km || 
|-id=480 bgcolor=#d6d6d6
| 349480 ||  || — || February 26, 2008 || Mount Lemmon || Mount Lemmon Survey || HIL3:2 || align=right | 5.5 km || 
|-id=481 bgcolor=#d6d6d6
| 349481 ||  || — || February 27, 2008 || Mount Lemmon || Mount Lemmon Survey || TEL || align=right | 1.9 km || 
|-id=482 bgcolor=#d6d6d6
| 349482 ||  || — || February 27, 2008 || Mount Lemmon || Mount Lemmon Survey || — || align=right | 2.5 km || 
|-id=483 bgcolor=#d6d6d6
| 349483 ||  || — || February 18, 2008 || Mount Lemmon || Mount Lemmon Survey || — || align=right | 3.4 km || 
|-id=484 bgcolor=#E9E9E9
| 349484 ||  || — || March 1, 2008 || Kitt Peak || Spacewatch || XIZ || align=right | 1.1 km || 
|-id=485 bgcolor=#fefefe
| 349485 ||  || — || March 3, 2008 || Catalina || CSS || H || align=right data-sort-value="0.89" | 890 m || 
|-id=486 bgcolor=#d6d6d6
| 349486 ||  || — || March 15, 2008 || Mount Lemmon || Mount Lemmon Survey || — || align=right | 4.0 km || 
|-id=487 bgcolor=#E9E9E9
| 349487 ||  || — || March 9, 2008 || Socorro || LINEAR || — || align=right | 3.2 km || 
|-id=488 bgcolor=#d6d6d6
| 349488 ||  || — || March 26, 2008 || Mount Lemmon || Mount Lemmon Survey || THM || align=right | 2.9 km || 
|-id=489 bgcolor=#d6d6d6
| 349489 ||  || — || March 29, 2008 || Mount Lemmon || Mount Lemmon Survey || — || align=right | 2.9 km || 
|-id=490 bgcolor=#fefefe
| 349490 ||  || — || April 1, 2008 || Kitt Peak || Spacewatch || — || align=right data-sort-value="0.65" | 650 m || 
|-id=491 bgcolor=#d6d6d6
| 349491 ||  || — || April 3, 2008 || Catalina || CSS || EUP || align=right | 4.4 km || 
|-id=492 bgcolor=#fefefe
| 349492 ||  || — || April 3, 2008 || Catalina || CSS || H || align=right data-sort-value="0.84" | 840 m || 
|-id=493 bgcolor=#d6d6d6
| 349493 ||  || — || April 4, 2008 || Kitt Peak || Spacewatch || — || align=right | 2.5 km || 
|-id=494 bgcolor=#E9E9E9
| 349494 ||  || — || January 19, 2008 || Mount Lemmon || Mount Lemmon Survey || — || align=right | 3.2 km || 
|-id=495 bgcolor=#d6d6d6
| 349495 ||  || — || May 3, 2008 || Siding Spring || SSS || — || align=right | 5.0 km || 
|-id=496 bgcolor=#C2FFFF
| 349496 ||  || — || May 27, 2008 || Kitt Peak || Spacewatch || L5 || align=right | 13 km || 
|-id=497 bgcolor=#fefefe
| 349497 ||  || — || July 1, 2008 || Kitt Peak || Spacewatch || FLO || align=right data-sort-value="0.70" | 700 m || 
|-id=498 bgcolor=#fefefe
| 349498 ||  || — || July 11, 2008 || La Sagra || OAM Obs. || NYS || align=right data-sort-value="0.63" | 630 m || 
|-id=499 bgcolor=#fefefe
| 349499 Dechirico ||  ||  || July 29, 2008 || Vallemare Borbon || V. S. Casulli || — || align=right data-sort-value="0.85" | 850 m || 
|-id=500 bgcolor=#fefefe
| 349500 ||  || — || July 29, 2008 || La Sagra || OAM Obs. || — || align=right data-sort-value="0.95" | 950 m || 
|}

349501–349600 

|-bgcolor=#fefefe
| 349501 ||  || — || July 29, 2008 || Kitt Peak || Spacewatch || MAS || align=right data-sort-value="0.57" | 570 m || 
|-id=502 bgcolor=#fefefe
| 349502 ||  || — || July 31, 2008 || Socorro || LINEAR || FLO || align=right data-sort-value="0.64" | 640 m || 
|-id=503 bgcolor=#fefefe
| 349503 ||  || — || August 3, 2008 || Dauban || F. Kugel || FLO || align=right data-sort-value="0.71" | 710 m || 
|-id=504 bgcolor=#fefefe
| 349504 ||  || — || August 9, 2008 || Reedy Creek || J. Broughton || — || align=right data-sort-value="0.78" | 780 m || 
|-id=505 bgcolor=#fefefe
| 349505 ||  || — || August 10, 2008 || La Sagra || OAM Obs. || — || align=right data-sort-value="0.73" | 730 m || 
|-id=506 bgcolor=#fefefe
| 349506 ||  || — || August 11, 2008 || Dauban || F. Kugel || NYS || align=right data-sort-value="0.65" | 650 m || 
|-id=507 bgcolor=#FFC2E0
| 349507 ||  || — || August 21, 2008 || Kitt Peak || Spacewatch || APOPHA || align=right data-sort-value="0.70" | 700 m || 
|-id=508 bgcolor=#E9E9E9
| 349508 ||  || — || August 22, 2008 || Kitt Peak || Spacewatch || — || align=right | 2.9 km || 
|-id=509 bgcolor=#fefefe
| 349509 ||  || — || August 22, 2008 || Kitt Peak || Spacewatch || NYS || align=right data-sort-value="0.70" | 700 m || 
|-id=510 bgcolor=#fefefe
| 349510 ||  || — || August 26, 2008 || La Sagra || OAM Obs. || NYS || align=right data-sort-value="0.69" | 690 m || 
|-id=511 bgcolor=#fefefe
| 349511 ||  || — || August 26, 2008 || La Sagra || OAM Obs. || — || align=right data-sort-value="0.65" | 650 m || 
|-id=512 bgcolor=#fefefe
| 349512 ||  || — || August 25, 2008 || Socorro || LINEAR || — || align=right data-sort-value="0.78" | 780 m || 
|-id=513 bgcolor=#fefefe
| 349513 ||  || — || September 2, 2008 || Hibiscus || S. F. Hönig, N. Teamo || V || align=right data-sort-value="0.74" | 740 m || 
|-id=514 bgcolor=#fefefe
| 349514 ||  || — || September 3, 2008 || Kitt Peak || Spacewatch || — || align=right data-sort-value="0.86" | 860 m || 
|-id=515 bgcolor=#fefefe
| 349515 ||  || — || September 4, 2008 || Kitt Peak || Spacewatch || — || align=right data-sort-value="0.87" | 870 m || 
|-id=516 bgcolor=#fefefe
| 349516 ||  || — || September 4, 2008 || Kitt Peak || Spacewatch || V || align=right data-sort-value="0.62" | 620 m || 
|-id=517 bgcolor=#fefefe
| 349517 ||  || — || September 4, 2008 || Socorro || LINEAR || — || align=right | 2.6 km || 
|-id=518 bgcolor=#fefefe
| 349518 ||  || — || September 2, 2008 || Kitt Peak || Spacewatch || MAS || align=right data-sort-value="0.82" | 820 m || 
|-id=519 bgcolor=#fefefe
| 349519 ||  || — || September 2, 2008 || Kitt Peak || Spacewatch || FLO || align=right data-sort-value="0.62" | 620 m || 
|-id=520 bgcolor=#fefefe
| 349520 ||  || — || September 2, 2008 || Kitt Peak || Spacewatch || — || align=right data-sort-value="0.87" | 870 m || 
|-id=521 bgcolor=#fefefe
| 349521 ||  || — || September 4, 2008 || Kitt Peak || Spacewatch || — || align=right data-sort-value="0.80" | 800 m || 
|-id=522 bgcolor=#fefefe
| 349522 ||  || — || September 4, 2008 || Kitt Peak || Spacewatch || — || align=right data-sort-value="0.74" | 740 m || 
|-id=523 bgcolor=#fefefe
| 349523 ||  || — || October 14, 2001 || Kitt Peak || Spacewatch || NYS || align=right data-sort-value="0.72" | 720 m || 
|-id=524 bgcolor=#fefefe
| 349524 ||  || — || September 6, 2008 || Catalina || CSS || — || align=right data-sort-value="0.85" | 850 m || 
|-id=525 bgcolor=#fefefe
| 349525 ||  || — || September 7, 2008 || Catalina || CSS || FLO || align=right data-sort-value="0.76" | 760 m || 
|-id=526 bgcolor=#fefefe
| 349526 ||  || — || September 7, 2008 || Mount Lemmon || Mount Lemmon Survey || — || align=right | 1.0 km || 
|-id=527 bgcolor=#fefefe
| 349527 ||  || — || September 6, 2008 || Kitt Peak || Spacewatch || — || align=right | 1.7 km || 
|-id=528 bgcolor=#fefefe
| 349528 ||  || — || September 6, 2008 || Mount Lemmon || Mount Lemmon Survey || — || align=right data-sort-value="0.81" | 810 m || 
|-id=529 bgcolor=#fefefe
| 349529 ||  || — || September 4, 2008 || Kitt Peak || Spacewatch || FLO || align=right data-sort-value="0.67" | 670 m || 
|-id=530 bgcolor=#fefefe
| 349530 ||  || — || September 6, 2008 || Catalina || CSS || V || align=right data-sort-value="0.77" | 770 m || 
|-id=531 bgcolor=#fefefe
| 349531 ||  || — || September 6, 2008 || Catalina || CSS || ERI || align=right | 1.7 km || 
|-id=532 bgcolor=#fefefe
| 349532 ||  || — || September 22, 2008 || Socorro || LINEAR || NYS || align=right data-sort-value="0.76" | 760 m || 
|-id=533 bgcolor=#fefefe
| 349533 ||  || — || September 22, 2008 || Socorro || LINEAR || FLO || align=right data-sort-value="0.80" | 800 m || 
|-id=534 bgcolor=#fefefe
| 349534 ||  || — || September 22, 2008 || Socorro || LINEAR || — || align=right data-sort-value="0.74" | 740 m || 
|-id=535 bgcolor=#fefefe
| 349535 ||  || — || September 19, 2008 || Kitt Peak || Spacewatch || FLO || align=right data-sort-value="0.65" | 650 m || 
|-id=536 bgcolor=#fefefe
| 349536 ||  || — || September 19, 2008 || Kitt Peak || Spacewatch || — || align=right data-sort-value="0.71" | 710 m || 
|-id=537 bgcolor=#fefefe
| 349537 ||  || — || November 1, 2005 || Mount Lemmon || Mount Lemmon Survey || — || align=right data-sort-value="0.83" | 830 m || 
|-id=538 bgcolor=#fefefe
| 349538 ||  || — || September 19, 2008 || Kitt Peak || Spacewatch || NYS || align=right data-sort-value="0.72" | 720 m || 
|-id=539 bgcolor=#fefefe
| 349539 ||  || — || September 20, 2008 || Kitt Peak || Spacewatch || — || align=right | 1.1 km || 
|-id=540 bgcolor=#fefefe
| 349540 ||  || — || September 20, 2008 || Catalina || CSS || — || align=right data-sort-value="0.86" | 860 m || 
|-id=541 bgcolor=#fefefe
| 349541 ||  || — || September 20, 2008 || Mount Lemmon || Mount Lemmon Survey || FLO || align=right data-sort-value="0.74" | 740 m || 
|-id=542 bgcolor=#fefefe
| 349542 ||  || — || September 20, 2008 || Mount Lemmon || Mount Lemmon Survey || MAS || align=right data-sort-value="0.79" | 790 m || 
|-id=543 bgcolor=#fefefe
| 349543 ||  || — || September 21, 2008 || Kitt Peak || Spacewatch || — || align=right data-sort-value="0.88" | 880 m || 
|-id=544 bgcolor=#fefefe
| 349544 ||  || — || September 23, 2008 || Mount Lemmon || Mount Lemmon Survey || — || align=right data-sort-value="0.79" | 790 m || 
|-id=545 bgcolor=#fefefe
| 349545 ||  || — || September 20, 2008 || Kitt Peak || Spacewatch || — || align=right | 1.1 km || 
|-id=546 bgcolor=#fefefe
| 349546 ||  || — || September 21, 2008 || Kitt Peak || Spacewatch || — || align=right data-sort-value="0.86" | 860 m || 
|-id=547 bgcolor=#E9E9E9
| 349547 ||  || — || September 21, 2008 || Kitt Peak || Spacewatch || — || align=right | 1.5 km || 
|-id=548 bgcolor=#fefefe
| 349548 ||  || — || September 22, 2008 || Kitt Peak || Spacewatch || V || align=right data-sort-value="0.88" | 880 m || 
|-id=549 bgcolor=#fefefe
| 349549 ||  || — || September 22, 2008 || Kitt Peak || Spacewatch || MAS || align=right data-sort-value="0.81" | 810 m || 
|-id=550 bgcolor=#fefefe
| 349550 ||  || — || September 22, 2008 || Mount Lemmon || Mount Lemmon Survey || NYS || align=right data-sort-value="0.55" | 550 m || 
|-id=551 bgcolor=#fefefe
| 349551 ||  || — || September 22, 2008 || Mount Lemmon || Mount Lemmon Survey || MAS || align=right data-sort-value="0.85" | 850 m || 
|-id=552 bgcolor=#E9E9E9
| 349552 ||  || — || September 22, 2008 || Mount Lemmon || Mount Lemmon Survey || — || align=right | 2.1 km || 
|-id=553 bgcolor=#fefefe
| 349553 ||  || — || September 22, 2008 || Kitt Peak || Spacewatch || — || align=right data-sort-value="0.82" | 820 m || 
|-id=554 bgcolor=#fefefe
| 349554 ||  || — || September 24, 2008 || Catalina || CSS || — || align=right | 1.4 km || 
|-id=555 bgcolor=#fefefe
| 349555 ||  || — || September 24, 2008 || Mount Lemmon || Mount Lemmon Survey || NYS || align=right data-sort-value="0.65" | 650 m || 
|-id=556 bgcolor=#fefefe
| 349556 ||  || — || September 24, 2008 || Mount Lemmon || Mount Lemmon Survey || — || align=right data-sort-value="0.86" | 860 m || 
|-id=557 bgcolor=#fefefe
| 349557 ||  || — || September 26, 2008 || Kitt Peak || Spacewatch || NYS || align=right data-sort-value="0.72" | 720 m || 
|-id=558 bgcolor=#fefefe
| 349558 ||  || — || September 24, 2008 || Catalina || CSS || ERI || align=right | 1.6 km || 
|-id=559 bgcolor=#fefefe
| 349559 ||  || — || September 24, 2008 || Socorro || LINEAR || — || align=right data-sort-value="0.81" | 810 m || 
|-id=560 bgcolor=#fefefe
| 349560 ||  || — || September 24, 2008 || Socorro || LINEAR || — || align=right data-sort-value="0.92" | 920 m || 
|-id=561 bgcolor=#fefefe
| 349561 ||  || — || September 24, 2008 || Socorro || LINEAR || NYS || align=right data-sort-value="0.69" | 690 m || 
|-id=562 bgcolor=#fefefe
| 349562 ||  || — || September 28, 2008 || Socorro || LINEAR || — || align=right data-sort-value="0.98" | 980 m || 
|-id=563 bgcolor=#fefefe
| 349563 ||  || — || September 2, 2008 || Kitt Peak || Spacewatch || MAS || align=right data-sort-value="0.77" | 770 m || 
|-id=564 bgcolor=#fefefe
| 349564 ||  || — || September 21, 2008 || Catalina || CSS || — || align=right | 1.1 km || 
|-id=565 bgcolor=#fefefe
| 349565 ||  || — || September 23, 2008 || Catalina || CSS || V || align=right data-sort-value="0.84" | 840 m || 
|-id=566 bgcolor=#fefefe
| 349566 ||  || — || September 24, 2008 || Mount Lemmon || Mount Lemmon Survey || — || align=right data-sort-value="0.93" | 930 m || 
|-id=567 bgcolor=#fefefe
| 349567 ||  || — || September 24, 2008 || Kitt Peak || Spacewatch || V || align=right data-sort-value="0.78" | 780 m || 
|-id=568 bgcolor=#fefefe
| 349568 ||  || — || March 12, 2007 || Kitt Peak || Spacewatch || — || align=right data-sort-value="0.89" | 890 m || 
|-id=569 bgcolor=#fefefe
| 349569 ||  || — || September 26, 2008 || Kitt Peak || Spacewatch || NYS || align=right data-sort-value="0.79" | 790 m || 
|-id=570 bgcolor=#fefefe
| 349570 ||  || — || September 26, 2008 || Kitt Peak || Spacewatch || NYS || align=right data-sort-value="0.79" | 790 m || 
|-id=571 bgcolor=#fefefe
| 349571 ||  || — || September 28, 2008 || Mount Lemmon || Mount Lemmon Survey || MAS || align=right data-sort-value="0.80" | 800 m || 
|-id=572 bgcolor=#fefefe
| 349572 ||  || — || September 28, 2008 || Mount Lemmon || Mount Lemmon Survey || — || align=right data-sort-value="0.91" | 910 m || 
|-id=573 bgcolor=#fefefe
| 349573 ||  || — || September 29, 2008 || Kitt Peak || Spacewatch || — || align=right data-sort-value="0.92" | 920 m || 
|-id=574 bgcolor=#fefefe
| 349574 ||  || — || September 29, 2008 || Catalina || CSS || NYS || align=right data-sort-value="0.73" | 730 m || 
|-id=575 bgcolor=#d6d6d6
| 349575 ||  || — || September 29, 2008 || Kitt Peak || Spacewatch || — || align=right | 4.0 km || 
|-id=576 bgcolor=#fefefe
| 349576 ||  || — || September 23, 2008 || Mount Lemmon || Mount Lemmon Survey || NYS || align=right data-sort-value="0.60" | 600 m || 
|-id=577 bgcolor=#fefefe
| 349577 ||  || — || September 24, 2008 || Kitt Peak || Spacewatch || — || align=right data-sort-value="0.78" | 780 m || 
|-id=578 bgcolor=#d6d6d6
| 349578 ||  || — || September 26, 2008 || Kitt Peak || Spacewatch || VER || align=right | 3.3 km || 
|-id=579 bgcolor=#fefefe
| 349579 ||  || — || September 26, 2008 || Kitt Peak || Spacewatch || NYS || align=right data-sort-value="0.75" | 750 m || 
|-id=580 bgcolor=#fefefe
| 349580 ||  || — || September 22, 2008 || Mount Lemmon || Mount Lemmon Survey || — || align=right | 1.3 km || 
|-id=581 bgcolor=#fefefe
| 349581 ||  || — || September 23, 2008 || Kitt Peak || Spacewatch || MAS || align=right data-sort-value="0.75" | 750 m || 
|-id=582 bgcolor=#fefefe
| 349582 ||  || — || September 22, 2008 || Socorro || LINEAR || V || align=right data-sort-value="0.88" | 880 m || 
|-id=583 bgcolor=#E9E9E9
| 349583 ||  || — || September 27, 2008 || Mount Lemmon || Mount Lemmon Survey || — || align=right | 1.4 km || 
|-id=584 bgcolor=#fefefe
| 349584 ||  || — || September 21, 2008 || Mount Lemmon || Mount Lemmon Survey || V || align=right data-sort-value="0.71" | 710 m || 
|-id=585 bgcolor=#fefefe
| 349585 ||  || — || September 22, 2008 || Catalina || CSS || — || align=right data-sort-value="0.98" | 980 m || 
|-id=586 bgcolor=#fefefe
| 349586 ||  || — || October 1, 2008 || La Sagra || OAM Obs. || — || align=right data-sort-value="0.99" | 990 m || 
|-id=587 bgcolor=#fefefe
| 349587 ||  || — || October 3, 2008 || La Sagra || OAM Obs. || V || align=right data-sort-value="0.71" | 710 m || 
|-id=588 bgcolor=#E9E9E9
| 349588 ||  || — || October 4, 2008 || La Sagra || OAM Obs. || — || align=right | 1.6 km || 
|-id=589 bgcolor=#d6d6d6
| 349589 ||  || — || September 2, 2008 || Kitt Peak || Spacewatch || — || align=right | 3.1 km || 
|-id=590 bgcolor=#fefefe
| 349590 ||  || — || October 1, 2008 || Mount Lemmon || Mount Lemmon Survey || MAS || align=right data-sort-value="0.75" | 750 m || 
|-id=591 bgcolor=#fefefe
| 349591 ||  || — || September 23, 2008 || Catalina || CSS || H || align=right | 1.0 km || 
|-id=592 bgcolor=#C2FFFF
| 349592 ||  || — || October 2, 2008 || Kitt Peak || Spacewatch || L4 || align=right | 10 km || 
|-id=593 bgcolor=#fefefe
| 349593 ||  || — || October 2, 2008 || Kitt Peak || Spacewatch || V || align=right data-sort-value="0.65" | 650 m || 
|-id=594 bgcolor=#E9E9E9
| 349594 ||  || — || October 2, 2008 || Kitt Peak || Spacewatch || — || align=right | 1.3 km || 
|-id=595 bgcolor=#fefefe
| 349595 ||  || — || October 2, 2008 || Kitt Peak || Spacewatch || NYS || align=right data-sort-value="0.68" | 680 m || 
|-id=596 bgcolor=#fefefe
| 349596 ||  || — || October 5, 2008 || La Sagra || OAM Obs. || V || align=right data-sort-value="0.79" | 790 m || 
|-id=597 bgcolor=#fefefe
| 349597 ||  || — || October 6, 2008 || Kitt Peak || Spacewatch || — || align=right data-sort-value="0.94" | 940 m || 
|-id=598 bgcolor=#fefefe
| 349598 ||  || — || October 6, 2008 || Kitt Peak || Spacewatch || MAS || align=right data-sort-value="0.97" | 970 m || 
|-id=599 bgcolor=#fefefe
| 349599 ||  || — || October 6, 2008 || Kitt Peak || Spacewatch || FLO || align=right | 1.0 km || 
|-id=600 bgcolor=#fefefe
| 349600 ||  || — || October 8, 2008 || Mount Lemmon || Mount Lemmon Survey || — || align=right | 1.2 km || 
|}

349601–349700 

|-bgcolor=#fefefe
| 349601 ||  || — || October 9, 2008 || Mount Lemmon || Mount Lemmon Survey || — || align=right | 1.7 km || 
|-id=602 bgcolor=#fefefe
| 349602 ||  || — || October 8, 2008 || Kitt Peak || Spacewatch || — || align=right | 1.7 km || 
|-id=603 bgcolor=#fefefe
| 349603 ||  || — || October 10, 2008 || Mount Lemmon || Mount Lemmon Survey || V || align=right data-sort-value="0.82" | 820 m || 
|-id=604 bgcolor=#fefefe
| 349604 ||  || — || October 20, 2008 || Goodricke-Pigott || R. A. Tucker || — || align=right | 3.4 km || 
|-id=605 bgcolor=#fefefe
| 349605 ||  || — || October 23, 2008 || Bergisch Gladbac || W. Bickel || MAS || align=right data-sort-value="0.82" | 820 m || 
|-id=606 bgcolor=#fefefe
| 349606 Fleurance ||  ||  || October 26, 2008 || Vicques || M. Ory || NYS || align=right data-sort-value="0.90" | 900 m || 
|-id=607 bgcolor=#fefefe
| 349607 ||  || — || October 18, 2008 || Kitt Peak || Spacewatch || FLO || align=right data-sort-value="0.73" | 730 m || 
|-id=608 bgcolor=#fefefe
| 349608 ||  || — || October 19, 2008 || Kitt Peak || Spacewatch || — || align=right data-sort-value="0.91" | 910 m || 
|-id=609 bgcolor=#E9E9E9
| 349609 ||  || — || October 20, 2008 || Kitt Peak || Spacewatch || AGN || align=right | 1.2 km || 
|-id=610 bgcolor=#fefefe
| 349610 ||  || — || October 20, 2008 || Kitt Peak || Spacewatch || — || align=right data-sort-value="0.78" | 780 m || 
|-id=611 bgcolor=#E9E9E9
| 349611 ||  || — || October 20, 2008 || Kitt Peak || Spacewatch || — || align=right | 1.1 km || 
|-id=612 bgcolor=#fefefe
| 349612 ||  || — || October 21, 2008 || Kitt Peak || Spacewatch || — || align=right | 1.7 km || 
|-id=613 bgcolor=#E9E9E9
| 349613 ||  || — || October 21, 2008 || Kitt Peak || Spacewatch || — || align=right | 1.2 km || 
|-id=614 bgcolor=#fefefe
| 349614 ||  || — || October 21, 2008 || Kitt Peak || Spacewatch || V || align=right data-sort-value="0.86" | 860 m || 
|-id=615 bgcolor=#fefefe
| 349615 ||  || — || October 21, 2008 || Kitt Peak || Spacewatch || — || align=right | 1.1 km || 
|-id=616 bgcolor=#fefefe
| 349616 ||  || — || October 22, 2008 || Mount Lemmon || Mount Lemmon Survey || — || align=right data-sort-value="0.86" | 860 m || 
|-id=617 bgcolor=#fefefe
| 349617 ||  || — || October 26, 2008 || Socorro || LINEAR || NYS || align=right data-sort-value="0.75" | 750 m || 
|-id=618 bgcolor=#fefefe
| 349618 ||  || — || October 20, 2008 || Kitt Peak || Spacewatch || V || align=right data-sort-value="0.93" | 930 m || 
|-id=619 bgcolor=#fefefe
| 349619 ||  || — || October 22, 2008 || Kitt Peak || Spacewatch || V || align=right data-sort-value="0.87" | 870 m || 
|-id=620 bgcolor=#E9E9E9
| 349620 ||  || — || October 22, 2008 || Kitt Peak || Spacewatch || — || align=right | 1.2 km || 
|-id=621 bgcolor=#E9E9E9
| 349621 ||  || — || October 23, 2008 || Kitt Peak || Spacewatch || — || align=right | 1.3 km || 
|-id=622 bgcolor=#fefefe
| 349622 ||  || — || October 23, 2008 || Kitt Peak || Spacewatch || V || align=right data-sort-value="0.94" | 940 m || 
|-id=623 bgcolor=#fefefe
| 349623 ||  || — || October 23, 2008 || Kitt Peak || Spacewatch || — || align=right data-sort-value="0.81" | 810 m || 
|-id=624 bgcolor=#fefefe
| 349624 ||  || — || October 8, 2004 || Kitt Peak || Spacewatch || — || align=right | 1.1 km || 
|-id=625 bgcolor=#fefefe
| 349625 ||  || — || October 23, 2008 || Kitt Peak || Spacewatch || V || align=right data-sort-value="0.78" | 780 m || 
|-id=626 bgcolor=#fefefe
| 349626 ||  || — || October 23, 2008 || Kitt Peak || Spacewatch || V || align=right data-sort-value="0.88" | 880 m || 
|-id=627 bgcolor=#fefefe
| 349627 ||  || — || October 23, 2008 || Kitt Peak || Spacewatch || EUT || align=right data-sort-value="0.74" | 740 m || 
|-id=628 bgcolor=#fefefe
| 349628 ||  || — || October 23, 2008 || Kitt Peak || Spacewatch || MAS || align=right data-sort-value="0.75" | 750 m || 
|-id=629 bgcolor=#fefefe
| 349629 ||  || — || October 23, 2008 || Kitt Peak || Spacewatch || — || align=right | 1.2 km || 
|-id=630 bgcolor=#E9E9E9
| 349630 ||  || — || October 24, 2008 || Kitt Peak || Spacewatch || MAR || align=right data-sort-value="0.81" | 810 m || 
|-id=631 bgcolor=#fefefe
| 349631 ||  || — || October 24, 2008 || Catalina || CSS || V || align=right data-sort-value="0.82" | 820 m || 
|-id=632 bgcolor=#fefefe
| 349632 ||  || — || October 24, 2008 || Mount Lemmon || Mount Lemmon Survey || V || align=right data-sort-value="0.59" | 590 m || 
|-id=633 bgcolor=#fefefe
| 349633 ||  || — || October 24, 2008 || Mount Lemmon || Mount Lemmon Survey || — || align=right data-sort-value="0.82" | 820 m || 
|-id=634 bgcolor=#E9E9E9
| 349634 ||  || — || October 24, 2008 || Kitt Peak || Spacewatch || — || align=right data-sort-value="0.90" | 900 m || 
|-id=635 bgcolor=#fefefe
| 349635 ||  || — || October 25, 2008 || Catalina || CSS || — || align=right data-sort-value="0.93" | 930 m || 
|-id=636 bgcolor=#fefefe
| 349636 ||  || — || October 25, 2008 || Socorro || LINEAR || CIM || align=right | 2.9 km || 
|-id=637 bgcolor=#E9E9E9
| 349637 ||  || — || October 23, 2008 || Kitt Peak || Spacewatch || — || align=right data-sort-value="0.69" | 690 m || 
|-id=638 bgcolor=#E9E9E9
| 349638 ||  || — || October 24, 2008 || Mount Lemmon || Mount Lemmon Survey || ADE || align=right | 3.7 km || 
|-id=639 bgcolor=#fefefe
| 349639 ||  || — || October 25, 2008 || Kitt Peak || Spacewatch || — || align=right | 1.1 km || 
|-id=640 bgcolor=#fefefe
| 349640 ||  || — || October 26, 2008 || Kitt Peak || Spacewatch || — || align=right data-sort-value="0.74" | 740 m || 
|-id=641 bgcolor=#fefefe
| 349641 ||  || — || October 26, 2008 || Kitt Peak || Spacewatch || NYS || align=right data-sort-value="0.79" | 790 m || 
|-id=642 bgcolor=#fefefe
| 349642 ||  || — || October 27, 2008 || Kitt Peak || Spacewatch || MAS || align=right data-sort-value="0.77" | 770 m || 
|-id=643 bgcolor=#fefefe
| 349643 ||  || — || October 27, 2008 || Kitt Peak || Spacewatch || NYS || align=right data-sort-value="0.75" | 750 m || 
|-id=644 bgcolor=#fefefe
| 349644 ||  || — || October 7, 2008 || Mount Lemmon || Mount Lemmon Survey || — || align=right data-sort-value="0.98" | 980 m || 
|-id=645 bgcolor=#E9E9E9
| 349645 ||  || — || October 28, 2008 || Kitt Peak || Spacewatch || — || align=right | 1.1 km || 
|-id=646 bgcolor=#E9E9E9
| 349646 ||  || — || October 28, 2008 || Kitt Peak || Spacewatch || — || align=right data-sort-value="0.95" | 950 m || 
|-id=647 bgcolor=#fefefe
| 349647 ||  || — || October 29, 2008 || Kitt Peak || Spacewatch || — || align=right | 1.1 km || 
|-id=648 bgcolor=#E9E9E9
| 349648 ||  || — || October 29, 2008 || Kitt Peak || Spacewatch || — || align=right | 1.00 km || 
|-id=649 bgcolor=#E9E9E9
| 349649 ||  || — || October 29, 2008 || Mount Lemmon || Mount Lemmon Survey || — || align=right | 1.9 km || 
|-id=650 bgcolor=#d6d6d6
| 349650 ||  || — || October 30, 2008 || Mount Lemmon || Mount Lemmon Survey || — || align=right | 3.6 km || 
|-id=651 bgcolor=#E9E9E9
| 349651 ||  || — || October 3, 2008 || Mount Lemmon || Mount Lemmon Survey || — || align=right | 1.7 km || 
|-id=652 bgcolor=#fefefe
| 349652 ||  || — || October 20, 2008 || Kitt Peak || Spacewatch || V || align=right data-sort-value="0.81" | 810 m || 
|-id=653 bgcolor=#E9E9E9
| 349653 ||  || — || October 30, 2008 || Kitt Peak || Spacewatch || — || align=right | 2.1 km || 
|-id=654 bgcolor=#fefefe
| 349654 ||  || — || October 21, 2008 || Kitt Peak || Spacewatch || V || align=right data-sort-value="0.80" | 800 m || 
|-id=655 bgcolor=#E9E9E9
| 349655 ||  || — || November 1, 2008 || Catalina || CSS || — || align=right data-sort-value="0.75" | 750 m || 
|-id=656 bgcolor=#fefefe
| 349656 ||  || — || November 2, 2008 || Mount Lemmon || Mount Lemmon Survey || — || align=right | 1.0 km || 
|-id=657 bgcolor=#fefefe
| 349657 ||  || — || November 1, 2008 || Mount Lemmon || Mount Lemmon Survey || NYS || align=right data-sort-value="0.60" | 600 m || 
|-id=658 bgcolor=#fefefe
| 349658 ||  || — || November 2, 2008 || Mount Lemmon || Mount Lemmon Survey || — || align=right | 1.1 km || 
|-id=659 bgcolor=#E9E9E9
| 349659 ||  || — || November 3, 2008 || Catalina || CSS || — || align=right | 2.6 km || 
|-id=660 bgcolor=#E9E9E9
| 349660 ||  || — || November 3, 2008 || Kitt Peak || Spacewatch || — || align=right | 1.8 km || 
|-id=661 bgcolor=#E9E9E9
| 349661 ||  || — || November 3, 2008 || Kitt Peak || Spacewatch || critical || align=right data-sort-value="0.78" | 780 m || 
|-id=662 bgcolor=#fefefe
| 349662 ||  || — || November 6, 2008 || Mount Lemmon || Mount Lemmon Survey || — || align=right | 1.2 km || 
|-id=663 bgcolor=#E9E9E9
| 349663 ||  || — || November 8, 2008 || Mount Lemmon || Mount Lemmon Survey || — || align=right | 2.3 km || 
|-id=664 bgcolor=#fefefe
| 349664 ||  || — || November 7, 2008 || Mount Lemmon || Mount Lemmon Survey || — || align=right | 1.1 km || 
|-id=665 bgcolor=#E9E9E9
| 349665 ||  || — || November 8, 2008 || Mount Lemmon || Mount Lemmon Survey || — || align=right | 2.0 km || 
|-id=666 bgcolor=#E9E9E9
| 349666 ||  || — || November 1, 2008 || Mount Lemmon || Mount Lemmon Survey || — || align=right | 2.0 km || 
|-id=667 bgcolor=#fefefe
| 349667 ||  || — || November 18, 2008 || La Sagra || OAM Obs. || — || align=right data-sort-value="0.93" | 930 m || 
|-id=668 bgcolor=#fefefe
| 349668 ||  || — || November 18, 2008 || Catalina || CSS || — || align=right | 1.2 km || 
|-id=669 bgcolor=#fefefe
| 349669 ||  || — || November 19, 2008 || Mount Lemmon || Mount Lemmon Survey || NYS || align=right data-sort-value="0.62" | 620 m || 
|-id=670 bgcolor=#fefefe
| 349670 ||  || — || November 22, 2008 || Pla D'Arguines || R. Ferrando || — || align=right data-sort-value="0.93" | 930 m || 
|-id=671 bgcolor=#fefefe
| 349671 ||  || — || November 18, 2008 || Kitt Peak || Spacewatch || NYS || align=right data-sort-value="0.70" | 700 m || 
|-id=672 bgcolor=#fefefe
| 349672 ||  || — || November 18, 2008 || Kitt Peak || Spacewatch || V || align=right data-sort-value="0.82" | 820 m || 
|-id=673 bgcolor=#E9E9E9
| 349673 ||  || — || November 19, 2008 || Mount Lemmon || Mount Lemmon Survey || — || align=right | 2.0 km || 
|-id=674 bgcolor=#E9E9E9
| 349674 ||  || — || November 20, 2008 || Kitt Peak || Spacewatch || MIS || align=right | 2.0 km || 
|-id=675 bgcolor=#E9E9E9
| 349675 ||  || — || September 29, 2008 || Mount Lemmon || Mount Lemmon Survey || — || align=right | 1.4 km || 
|-id=676 bgcolor=#E9E9E9
| 349676 ||  || — || November 20, 2008 || Kitt Peak || Spacewatch || — || align=right | 2.0 km || 
|-id=677 bgcolor=#E9E9E9
| 349677 ||  || — || November 20, 2008 || Kitt Peak || Spacewatch || — || align=right | 1.2 km || 
|-id=678 bgcolor=#fefefe
| 349678 ||  || — || November 20, 2008 || Kitt Peak || Spacewatch || ERI || align=right | 2.5 km || 
|-id=679 bgcolor=#E9E9E9
| 349679 ||  || — || November 21, 2008 || Mount Lemmon || Mount Lemmon Survey || — || align=right | 2.7 km || 
|-id=680 bgcolor=#fefefe
| 349680 ||  || — || November 21, 2008 || Kitt Peak || Spacewatch || MAS || align=right data-sort-value="0.78" | 780 m || 
|-id=681 bgcolor=#E9E9E9
| 349681 ||  || — || November 21, 2008 || Mount Lemmon || Mount Lemmon Survey || JUN || align=right | 3.7 km || 
|-id=682 bgcolor=#E9E9E9
| 349682 ||  || — || November 22, 2008 || Mount Lemmon || Mount Lemmon Survey || — || align=right | 1.9 km || 
|-id=683 bgcolor=#E9E9E9
| 349683 ||  || — || November 22, 2008 || Mount Lemmon || Mount Lemmon Survey || — || align=right | 2.7 km || 
|-id=684 bgcolor=#E9E9E9
| 349684 ||  || — || November 24, 2008 || La Sagra || OAM Obs. || — || align=right | 3.2 km || 
|-id=685 bgcolor=#E9E9E9
| 349685 ||  || — || November 30, 2008 || Catalina || CSS || — || align=right | 1.5 km || 
|-id=686 bgcolor=#fefefe
| 349686 ||  || — || November 30, 2008 || Kitt Peak || Spacewatch || V || align=right data-sort-value="0.84" | 840 m || 
|-id=687 bgcolor=#E9E9E9
| 349687 ||  || — || November 30, 2008 || Kitt Peak || Spacewatch || — || align=right | 1.2 km || 
|-id=688 bgcolor=#fefefe
| 349688 ||  || — || November 30, 2008 || Kitt Peak || Spacewatch || — || align=right | 1.1 km || 
|-id=689 bgcolor=#E9E9E9
| 349689 ||  || — || November 30, 2008 || Mount Lemmon || Mount Lemmon Survey || — || align=right | 1.6 km || 
|-id=690 bgcolor=#fefefe
| 349690 ||  || — || November 19, 2008 || Socorro || LINEAR || V || align=right data-sort-value="0.81" | 810 m || 
|-id=691 bgcolor=#E9E9E9
| 349691 ||  || — || November 19, 2008 || Kitt Peak || Spacewatch || — || align=right | 1.4 km || 
|-id=692 bgcolor=#E9E9E9
| 349692 ||  || — || November 21, 2008 || Mount Lemmon || Mount Lemmon Survey || — || align=right | 3.3 km || 
|-id=693 bgcolor=#E9E9E9
| 349693 ||  || — || December 6, 2008 || Mount Lemmon || Mount Lemmon Survey || — || align=right | 2.4 km || 
|-id=694 bgcolor=#FA8072
| 349694 ||  || — || December 7, 2008 || Mount Lemmon || Mount Lemmon Survey || — || align=right | 2.1 km || 
|-id=695 bgcolor=#E9E9E9
| 349695 ||  || — || December 2, 2008 || Socorro || LINEAR || — || align=right | 1.6 km || 
|-id=696 bgcolor=#E9E9E9
| 349696 ||  || — || December 3, 2008 || Socorro || LINEAR || MAR || align=right | 1.7 km || 
|-id=697 bgcolor=#E9E9E9
| 349697 ||  || — || December 1, 2008 || Catalina || CSS || — || align=right | 1.0 km || 
|-id=698 bgcolor=#E9E9E9
| 349698 ||  || — || December 1, 2008 || Kitt Peak || Spacewatch || — || align=right | 1.8 km || 
|-id=699 bgcolor=#fefefe
| 349699 ||  || — || December 3, 2008 || Kitt Peak || Spacewatch || — || align=right | 1.1 km || 
|-id=700 bgcolor=#E9E9E9
| 349700 ||  || — || August 10, 2007 || Kitt Peak || Spacewatch || — || align=right | 1.0 km || 
|}

349701–349800 

|-bgcolor=#E9E9E9
| 349701 ||  || — || December 2, 2008 || Kitt Peak || Spacewatch || RAF || align=right | 1.0 km || 
|-id=702 bgcolor=#E9E9E9
| 349702 ||  || — || December 4, 2008 || Mount Lemmon || Mount Lemmon Survey || — || align=right | 1.2 km || 
|-id=703 bgcolor=#fefefe
| 349703 ||  || — || December 4, 2008 || Mount Lemmon || Mount Lemmon Survey || MAS || align=right data-sort-value="0.97" | 970 m || 
|-id=704 bgcolor=#E9E9E9
| 349704 ||  || — || December 3, 2008 || Socorro || LINEAR || — || align=right | 1.2 km || 
|-id=705 bgcolor=#E9E9E9
| 349705 ||  || — || December 3, 2008 || Catalina || CSS || — || align=right | 1.8 km || 
|-id=706 bgcolor=#E9E9E9
| 349706 ||  || — || December 4, 2008 || Catalina || CSS || BRU || align=right | 4.7 km || 
|-id=707 bgcolor=#E9E9E9
| 349707 ||  || — || December 21, 2008 || Mayhill || A. Lowe || — || align=right | 1.5 km || 
|-id=708 bgcolor=#E9E9E9
| 349708 ||  || — || December 1, 2008 || Catalina || CSS || — || align=right | 1.5 km || 
|-id=709 bgcolor=#E9E9E9
| 349709 ||  || — || November 19, 2003 || Kitt Peak || Spacewatch || — || align=right | 1.9 km || 
|-id=710 bgcolor=#E9E9E9
| 349710 ||  || — || December 22, 2008 || Marly || P. Kocher || — || align=right | 2.0 km || 
|-id=711 bgcolor=#fefefe
| 349711 ||  || — || April 4, 2002 || Kitt Peak || Spacewatch || MAS || align=right data-sort-value="0.84" | 840 m || 
|-id=712 bgcolor=#fefefe
| 349712 ||  || — || December 24, 2008 || Weihai || Shandong University Obs. || NYS || align=right data-sort-value="0.75" | 750 m || 
|-id=713 bgcolor=#E9E9E9
| 349713 ||  || — || December 25, 2008 || Weihai || Shandong University Obs. || — || align=right | 1.1 km || 
|-id=714 bgcolor=#E9E9E9
| 349714 ||  || — || November 19, 2008 || Kitt Peak || Spacewatch || — || align=right | 1.5 km || 
|-id=715 bgcolor=#E9E9E9
| 349715 ||  || — || December 21, 2008 || Mount Lemmon || Mount Lemmon Survey || — || align=right | 1.3 km || 
|-id=716 bgcolor=#E9E9E9
| 349716 ||  || — || December 24, 2008 || Dauban || F. Kugel || — || align=right | 1.4 km || 
|-id=717 bgcolor=#fefefe
| 349717 ||  || — || December 29, 2008 || Piszkéstető || K. Sárneczky || NYS || align=right data-sort-value="0.72" | 720 m || 
|-id=718 bgcolor=#E9E9E9
| 349718 ||  || — || December 22, 2008 || Kitt Peak || Spacewatch || — || align=right | 3.5 km || 
|-id=719 bgcolor=#fefefe
| 349719 ||  || — || December 29, 2008 || Kitt Peak || Spacewatch || MAS || align=right | 1.0 km || 
|-id=720 bgcolor=#E9E9E9
| 349720 ||  || — || December 29, 2008 || Kitt Peak || Spacewatch || — || align=right | 2.0 km || 
|-id=721 bgcolor=#E9E9E9
| 349721 ||  || — || December 29, 2008 || Mount Lemmon || Mount Lemmon Survey || — || align=right | 2.2 km || 
|-id=722 bgcolor=#E9E9E9
| 349722 ||  || — || December 29, 2008 || Mount Lemmon || Mount Lemmon Survey || — || align=right | 2.2 km || 
|-id=723 bgcolor=#E9E9E9
| 349723 ||  || — || December 29, 2008 || Mount Lemmon || Mount Lemmon Survey || — || align=right | 2.0 km || 
|-id=724 bgcolor=#E9E9E9
| 349724 ||  || — || December 30, 2008 || Mount Lemmon || Mount Lemmon Survey || WIT || align=right data-sort-value="0.85" | 850 m || 
|-id=725 bgcolor=#E9E9E9
| 349725 ||  || — || December 30, 2008 || Catalina || CSS || — || align=right | 1.6 km || 
|-id=726 bgcolor=#E9E9E9
| 349726 ||  || — || December 4, 2008 || Mount Lemmon || Mount Lemmon Survey || — || align=right | 1.4 km || 
|-id=727 bgcolor=#E9E9E9
| 349727 ||  || — || December 29, 2008 || Kitt Peak || Spacewatch || — || align=right | 1.3 km || 
|-id=728 bgcolor=#E9E9E9
| 349728 ||  || — || December 29, 2008 || Mount Lemmon || Mount Lemmon Survey || HNS || align=right | 1.6 km || 
|-id=729 bgcolor=#E9E9E9
| 349729 ||  || — || December 30, 2008 || Mount Lemmon || Mount Lemmon Survey || AGN || align=right | 1.3 km || 
|-id=730 bgcolor=#fefefe
| 349730 ||  || — || December 30, 2008 || Kitt Peak || Spacewatch || — || align=right data-sort-value="0.96" | 960 m || 
|-id=731 bgcolor=#E9E9E9
| 349731 ||  || — || December 29, 2008 || Kitt Peak || Spacewatch || MIS || align=right | 2.0 km || 
|-id=732 bgcolor=#E9E9E9
| 349732 ||  || — || December 29, 2008 || Kitt Peak || Spacewatch || MAR || align=right data-sort-value="0.90" | 900 m || 
|-id=733 bgcolor=#E9E9E9
| 349733 ||  || — || December 29, 2008 || Mount Lemmon || Mount Lemmon Survey || NEM || align=right | 2.3 km || 
|-id=734 bgcolor=#fefefe
| 349734 ||  || — || December 29, 2008 || Kitt Peak || Spacewatch || V || align=right data-sort-value="0.87" | 870 m || 
|-id=735 bgcolor=#E9E9E9
| 349735 ||  || — || December 29, 2008 || Kitt Peak || Spacewatch || — || align=right | 1.4 km || 
|-id=736 bgcolor=#E9E9E9
| 349736 ||  || — || December 29, 2008 || Kitt Peak || Spacewatch || ADE || align=right | 1.8 km || 
|-id=737 bgcolor=#E9E9E9
| 349737 ||  || — || December 30, 2008 || Kitt Peak || Spacewatch || — || align=right | 1.1 km || 
|-id=738 bgcolor=#E9E9E9
| 349738 ||  || — || December 30, 2008 || Kitt Peak || Spacewatch || HOF || align=right | 3.0 km || 
|-id=739 bgcolor=#E9E9E9
| 349739 ||  || — || December 29, 2008 || Mount Lemmon || Mount Lemmon Survey || WIT || align=right | 1.1 km || 
|-id=740 bgcolor=#E9E9E9
| 349740 ||  || — || December 30, 2008 || Kitt Peak || Spacewatch || BRU || align=right | 2.6 km || 
|-id=741 bgcolor=#E9E9E9
| 349741 ||  || — || December 31, 2008 || Kitt Peak || Spacewatch || — || align=right | 1.9 km || 
|-id=742 bgcolor=#E9E9E9
| 349742 ||  || — || December 31, 2008 || Kitt Peak || Spacewatch || — || align=right | 1.3 km || 
|-id=743 bgcolor=#E9E9E9
| 349743 ||  || — || December 30, 2008 || Kitt Peak || Spacewatch || — || align=right data-sort-value="0.82" | 820 m || 
|-id=744 bgcolor=#fefefe
| 349744 ||  || — || December 30, 2008 || Kitt Peak || Spacewatch || MAS || align=right data-sort-value="0.80" | 800 m || 
|-id=745 bgcolor=#E9E9E9
| 349745 ||  || — || December 30, 2008 || Mount Lemmon || Mount Lemmon Survey || — || align=right | 1.3 km || 
|-id=746 bgcolor=#E9E9E9
| 349746 ||  || — || December 30, 2008 || Kitt Peak || Spacewatch || — || align=right | 1.6 km || 
|-id=747 bgcolor=#E9E9E9
| 349747 ||  || — || December 30, 2008 || Kitt Peak || Spacewatch || JUN || align=right | 1.3 km || 
|-id=748 bgcolor=#E9E9E9
| 349748 ||  || — || December 22, 2008 || Mount Lemmon || Mount Lemmon Survey || AGN || align=right | 1.3 km || 
|-id=749 bgcolor=#d6d6d6
| 349749 ||  || — || December 22, 2008 || Kitt Peak || Spacewatch || — || align=right | 2.0 km || 
|-id=750 bgcolor=#E9E9E9
| 349750 ||  || — || December 22, 2008 || Catalina || CSS || — || align=right | 1.6 km || 
|-id=751 bgcolor=#E9E9E9
| 349751 ||  || — || December 30, 2008 || Mount Lemmon || Mount Lemmon Survey || MAR || align=right | 1.2 km || 
|-id=752 bgcolor=#E9E9E9
| 349752 ||  || — || December 21, 2008 || Mount Lemmon || Mount Lemmon Survey || — || align=right | 2.6 km || 
|-id=753 bgcolor=#fefefe
| 349753 ||  || — || September 10, 2004 || Kitt Peak || Spacewatch || NYS || align=right data-sort-value="0.80" | 800 m || 
|-id=754 bgcolor=#E9E9E9
| 349754 ||  || — || December 31, 2008 || Socorro || LINEAR || — || align=right | 1.7 km || 
|-id=755 bgcolor=#fefefe
| 349755 ||  || — || January 4, 2009 || Weihai || Shandong University Obs. || V || align=right | 1.1 km || 
|-id=756 bgcolor=#E9E9E9
| 349756 ||  || — || October 25, 2008 || Mount Lemmon || Mount Lemmon Survey || — || align=right | 1.4 km || 
|-id=757 bgcolor=#E9E9E9
| 349757 ||  || — || January 2, 2009 || Mount Lemmon || Mount Lemmon Survey || — || align=right | 1.6 km || 
|-id=758 bgcolor=#E9E9E9
| 349758 ||  || — || January 2, 2009 || Mount Lemmon || Mount Lemmon Survey || — || align=right | 3.0 km || 
|-id=759 bgcolor=#E9E9E9
| 349759 ||  || — || January 2, 2009 || Kitt Peak || Spacewatch || — || align=right | 1.4 km || 
|-id=760 bgcolor=#E9E9E9
| 349760 ||  || — || January 2, 2009 || Mount Lemmon || Mount Lemmon Survey || — || align=right | 2.3 km || 
|-id=761 bgcolor=#E9E9E9
| 349761 ||  || — || January 3, 2009 || Kitt Peak || Spacewatch || — || align=right | 2.1 km || 
|-id=762 bgcolor=#fefefe
| 349762 ||  || — || January 2, 2009 || Kitt Peak || Spacewatch || MAS || align=right data-sort-value="0.95" | 950 m || 
|-id=763 bgcolor=#E9E9E9
| 349763 ||  || — || January 2, 2009 || Kitt Peak || Spacewatch || EUN || align=right | 1.4 km || 
|-id=764 bgcolor=#E9E9E9
| 349764 ||  || — || January 8, 2009 || Kitt Peak || Spacewatch || ADE || align=right | 2.0 km || 
|-id=765 bgcolor=#E9E9E9
| 349765 ||  || — || January 15, 2009 || Kitt Peak || Spacewatch || — || align=right | 2.0 km || 
|-id=766 bgcolor=#E9E9E9
| 349766 ||  || — || January 7, 2009 || Wrightwood || J. W. Young || — || align=right | 1.1 km || 
|-id=767 bgcolor=#E9E9E9
| 349767 ||  || — || January 17, 2009 || Calar Alto || F. Hormuth || PAD || align=right | 1.6 km || 
|-id=768 bgcolor=#fefefe
| 349768 ||  || — || January 17, 2009 || Socorro || LINEAR || — || align=right | 1.4 km || 
|-id=769 bgcolor=#fefefe
| 349769 ||  || — || January 18, 2009 || Socorro || LINEAR || — || align=right | 2.4 km || 
|-id=770 bgcolor=#E9E9E9
| 349770 ||  || — || January 21, 2009 || Mayhill || A. Lowe || IAN || align=right data-sort-value="0.93" | 930 m || 
|-id=771 bgcolor=#E9E9E9
| 349771 ||  || — || January 17, 2009 || Socorro || LINEAR || — || align=right | 2.4 km || 
|-id=772 bgcolor=#E9E9E9
| 349772 ||  || — || January 17, 2009 || Socorro || LINEAR || — || align=right | 1.9 km || 
|-id=773 bgcolor=#E9E9E9
| 349773 ||  || — || January 18, 2009 || Socorro || LINEAR || — || align=right | 2.3 km || 
|-id=774 bgcolor=#E9E9E9
| 349774 ||  || — || January 21, 2009 || Great Shefford || P. Birtwhistle || — || align=right | 1.7 km || 
|-id=775 bgcolor=#E9E9E9
| 349775 ||  || — || January 16, 2009 || Kitt Peak || Spacewatch || JUN || align=right | 1.4 km || 
|-id=776 bgcolor=#E9E9E9
| 349776 ||  || — || January 16, 2009 || Mount Lemmon || Mount Lemmon Survey || — || align=right | 2.6 km || 
|-id=777 bgcolor=#fefefe
| 349777 ||  || — || January 16, 2009 || Mount Lemmon || Mount Lemmon Survey || V || align=right data-sort-value="0.88" | 880 m || 
|-id=778 bgcolor=#E9E9E9
| 349778 ||  || — || January 16, 2009 || Kitt Peak || Spacewatch || NEM || align=right | 2.5 km || 
|-id=779 bgcolor=#E9E9E9
| 349779 ||  || — || January 16, 2009 || Kitt Peak || Spacewatch || — || align=right | 1.4 km || 
|-id=780 bgcolor=#d6d6d6
| 349780 ||  || — || January 16, 2009 || Kitt Peak || Spacewatch || CHA || align=right | 1.9 km || 
|-id=781 bgcolor=#E9E9E9
| 349781 ||  || — || January 16, 2009 || Kitt Peak || Spacewatch || — || align=right | 1.3 km || 
|-id=782 bgcolor=#E9E9E9
| 349782 ||  || — || January 16, 2009 || Kitt Peak || Spacewatch || HOF || align=right | 2.6 km || 
|-id=783 bgcolor=#E9E9E9
| 349783 ||  || — || January 16, 2009 || Mount Lemmon || Mount Lemmon Survey || AGN || align=right | 1.2 km || 
|-id=784 bgcolor=#d6d6d6
| 349784 ||  || — || January 16, 2009 || Mount Lemmon || Mount Lemmon Survey || — || align=right | 4.2 km || 
|-id=785 bgcolor=#E9E9E9
| 349785 Hsiaotejen ||  ||  || January 16, 2009 || Lulin Observatory || X. Y. Hsiao, Q.-z. Ye || — || align=right | 2.3 km || 
|-id=786 bgcolor=#E9E9E9
| 349786 ||  || — || January 17, 2009 || Kitt Peak || Spacewatch || EUN || align=right | 1.8 km || 
|-id=787 bgcolor=#E9E9E9
| 349787 ||  || — || January 18, 2009 || Mount Lemmon || Mount Lemmon Survey || AGN || align=right | 1.1 km || 
|-id=788 bgcolor=#E9E9E9
| 349788 ||  || — || January 20, 2009 || Catalina || CSS || ADE || align=right | 2.1 km || 
|-id=789 bgcolor=#E9E9E9
| 349789 ||  || — || January 20, 2009 || Catalina || CSS || — || align=right | 1.3 km || 
|-id=790 bgcolor=#E9E9E9
| 349790 ||  || — || January 23, 2009 || Purple Mountain || PMO NEO || MIS || align=right | 2.6 km || 
|-id=791 bgcolor=#E9E9E9
| 349791 ||  || — || January 25, 2009 || Catalina || CSS || — || align=right | 2.9 km || 
|-id=792 bgcolor=#E9E9E9
| 349792 ||  || — || January 25, 2009 || Catalina || CSS || — || align=right | 1.8 km || 
|-id=793 bgcolor=#E9E9E9
| 349793 ||  || — || January 16, 2009 || Mount Lemmon || Mount Lemmon Survey || — || align=right | 1.2 km || 
|-id=794 bgcolor=#E9E9E9
| 349794 ||  || — || January 17, 2009 || Kitt Peak || Spacewatch || JUN || align=right | 1.0 km || 
|-id=795 bgcolor=#E9E9E9
| 349795 ||  || — || January 27, 2009 || Purple Mountain || PMO NEO || JUN || align=right | 1.4 km || 
|-id=796 bgcolor=#E9E9E9
| 349796 ||  || — || January 31, 2009 || Socorro || LINEAR || — || align=right | 1.2 km || 
|-id=797 bgcolor=#E9E9E9
| 349797 ||  || — || September 30, 2003 || Apache Point || SDSS || — || align=right | 1.5 km || 
|-id=798 bgcolor=#E9E9E9
| 349798 ||  || — || January 25, 2009 || Kitt Peak || Spacewatch || — || align=right | 2.7 km || 
|-id=799 bgcolor=#E9E9E9
| 349799 ||  || — || January 25, 2009 || Kitt Peak || Spacewatch || NEM || align=right | 2.6 km || 
|-id=800 bgcolor=#E9E9E9
| 349800 ||  || — || January 25, 2009 || Kitt Peak || Spacewatch || — || align=right | 2.6 km || 
|}

349801–349900 

|-bgcolor=#E9E9E9
| 349801 ||  || — || January 25, 2009 || Kitt Peak || Spacewatch || — || align=right | 1.6 km || 
|-id=802 bgcolor=#E9E9E9
| 349802 ||  || — || January 26, 2009 || Mount Lemmon || Mount Lemmon Survey || PAD || align=right | 1.9 km || 
|-id=803 bgcolor=#E9E9E9
| 349803 ||  || — || January 28, 2009 || Catalina || CSS || — || align=right | 2.0 km || 
|-id=804 bgcolor=#fefefe
| 349804 ||  || — || January 28, 2009 || Catalina || CSS || FLO || align=right data-sort-value="0.67" | 670 m || 
|-id=805 bgcolor=#E9E9E9
| 349805 ||  || — || January 27, 2009 || Purple Mountain || PMO NEO || — || align=right | 2.1 km || 
|-id=806 bgcolor=#d6d6d6
| 349806 ||  || — || January 31, 2009 || Mount Lemmon || Mount Lemmon Survey || — || align=right | 2.7 km || 
|-id=807 bgcolor=#d6d6d6
| 349807 ||  || — || January 31, 2009 || Mount Lemmon || Mount Lemmon Survey || — || align=right | 3.4 km || 
|-id=808 bgcolor=#E9E9E9
| 349808 ||  || — || January 29, 2009 || Catalina || CSS || — || align=right | 1.00 km || 
|-id=809 bgcolor=#E9E9E9
| 349809 ||  || — || January 31, 2009 || Kitt Peak || Spacewatch || — || align=right | 1.7 km || 
|-id=810 bgcolor=#E9E9E9
| 349810 ||  || — || January 27, 2009 || Purple Mountain || PMO NEO || — || align=right | 2.6 km || 
|-id=811 bgcolor=#E9E9E9
| 349811 ||  || — || January 18, 2009 || Catalina || CSS || — || align=right | 2.8 km || 
|-id=812 bgcolor=#E9E9E9
| 349812 ||  || — || January 30, 2009 || Kitt Peak || Spacewatch || — || align=right | 2.4 km || 
|-id=813 bgcolor=#E9E9E9
| 349813 ||  || — || January 30, 2009 || Kitt Peak || Spacewatch || AGN || align=right | 1.0 km || 
|-id=814 bgcolor=#E9E9E9
| 349814 ||  || — || January 31, 2009 || Kitt Peak || Spacewatch || — || align=right | 3.1 km || 
|-id=815 bgcolor=#E9E9E9
| 349815 ||  || — || January 31, 2009 || Kitt Peak || Spacewatch || — || align=right | 2.5 km || 
|-id=816 bgcolor=#E9E9E9
| 349816 ||  || — || January 31, 2009 || Kitt Peak || Spacewatch || — || align=right | 1.5 km || 
|-id=817 bgcolor=#E9E9E9
| 349817 ||  || — || January 31, 2009 || Kitt Peak || Spacewatch || — || align=right | 1.3 km || 
|-id=818 bgcolor=#E9E9E9
| 349818 ||  || — || January 16, 2009 || Kitt Peak || Spacewatch || HEN || align=right | 1.2 km || 
|-id=819 bgcolor=#d6d6d6
| 349819 ||  || — || January 25, 2009 || Kitt Peak || Spacewatch || KOR || align=right | 1.4 km || 
|-id=820 bgcolor=#E9E9E9
| 349820 ||  || — || January 31, 2009 || Mount Lemmon || Mount Lemmon Survey || — || align=right | 2.2 km || 
|-id=821 bgcolor=#E9E9E9
| 349821 ||  || — || January 20, 2009 || Mount Lemmon || Mount Lemmon Survey || MRX || align=right | 1.4 km || 
|-id=822 bgcolor=#E9E9E9
| 349822 ||  || — || January 26, 2009 || Catalina || CSS || — || align=right | 2.2 km || 
|-id=823 bgcolor=#E9E9E9
| 349823 ||  || — || January 17, 2009 || Socorro || LINEAR || — || align=right | 1.1 km || 
|-id=824 bgcolor=#E9E9E9
| 349824 ||  || — || January 18, 2009 || Kitt Peak || Spacewatch || NEM || align=right | 2.6 km || 
|-id=825 bgcolor=#d6d6d6
| 349825 ||  || — || January 18, 2009 || Kitt Peak || Spacewatch || — || align=right | 3.3 km || 
|-id=826 bgcolor=#d6d6d6
| 349826 ||  || — || February 14, 2009 || Heppenheim || Starkenburg Obs. || KOR || align=right | 1.3 km || 
|-id=827 bgcolor=#E9E9E9
| 349827 ||  || — || February 1, 2009 || Catalina || CSS || — || align=right | 1.5 km || 
|-id=828 bgcolor=#E9E9E9
| 349828 ||  || — || February 1, 2009 || Kitt Peak || Spacewatch || — || align=right | 1.6 km || 
|-id=829 bgcolor=#E9E9E9
| 349829 ||  || — || February 3, 2009 || Kitt Peak || Spacewatch || — || align=right | 1.2 km || 
|-id=830 bgcolor=#E9E9E9
| 349830 ||  || — || February 3, 2009 || Mount Lemmon || Mount Lemmon Survey || HOF || align=right | 2.5 km || 
|-id=831 bgcolor=#E9E9E9
| 349831 ||  || — || February 3, 2009 || Mount Lemmon || Mount Lemmon Survey || ADE || align=right | 2.3 km || 
|-id=832 bgcolor=#E9E9E9
| 349832 ||  || — || February 4, 2009 || Mount Lemmon || Mount Lemmon Survey || — || align=right | 2.4 km || 
|-id=833 bgcolor=#E9E9E9
| 349833 ||  || — || February 1, 2009 || Kitt Peak || Spacewatch || — || align=right | 2.4 km || 
|-id=834 bgcolor=#E9E9E9
| 349834 ||  || — || February 1, 2009 || Kitt Peak || Spacewatch || — || align=right | 2.6 km || 
|-id=835 bgcolor=#E9E9E9
| 349835 ||  || — || February 1, 2009 || Kitt Peak || Spacewatch || AEO || align=right data-sort-value="0.99" | 990 m || 
|-id=836 bgcolor=#E9E9E9
| 349836 ||  || — || February 1, 2009 || Kitt Peak || Spacewatch || — || align=right | 1.2 km || 
|-id=837 bgcolor=#E9E9E9
| 349837 ||  || — || February 2, 2009 || Kitt Peak || Spacewatch || — || align=right | 1.9 km || 
|-id=838 bgcolor=#d6d6d6
| 349838 ||  || — || February 3, 2009 || Kitt Peak || Spacewatch || KOR || align=right | 1.6 km || 
|-id=839 bgcolor=#d6d6d6
| 349839 ||  || — || February 4, 2009 || Kitt Peak || Spacewatch || — || align=right | 3.5 km || 
|-id=840 bgcolor=#E9E9E9
| 349840 ||  || — || February 14, 2009 || Catalina || CSS || DOR || align=right | 2.7 km || 
|-id=841 bgcolor=#E9E9E9
| 349841 ||  || — || February 14, 2009 || Mount Lemmon || Mount Lemmon Survey || — || align=right | 1.6 km || 
|-id=842 bgcolor=#E9E9E9
| 349842 ||  || — || February 14, 2009 || Mount Lemmon || Mount Lemmon Survey || — || align=right | 1.2 km || 
|-id=843 bgcolor=#d6d6d6
| 349843 ||  || — || February 14, 2009 || Mount Lemmon || Mount Lemmon Survey || — || align=right | 2.2 km || 
|-id=844 bgcolor=#E9E9E9
| 349844 ||  || — || November 19, 2003 || Anderson Mesa || LONEOS || — || align=right | 1.8 km || 
|-id=845 bgcolor=#E9E9E9
| 349845 ||  || — || November 23, 2008 || Mount Lemmon || Mount Lemmon Survey || — || align=right | 1.9 km || 
|-id=846 bgcolor=#E9E9E9
| 349846 ||  || — || February 5, 2009 || Catalina || CSS || — || align=right | 3.4 km || 
|-id=847 bgcolor=#d6d6d6
| 349847 ||  || — || February 4, 2009 || Mount Lemmon || Mount Lemmon Survey || — || align=right | 4.4 km || 
|-id=848 bgcolor=#E9E9E9
| 349848 ||  || — || February 1, 2009 || Kitt Peak || Spacewatch || — || align=right | 2.1 km || 
|-id=849 bgcolor=#E9E9E9
| 349849 ||  || — || February 1, 2009 || Socorro || LINEAR || — || align=right | 2.2 km || 
|-id=850 bgcolor=#E9E9E9
| 349850 ||  || — || February 2, 2009 || Kitt Peak || Spacewatch || — || align=right | 2.6 km || 
|-id=851 bgcolor=#d6d6d6
| 349851 ||  || — || January 31, 2009 || Kitt Peak || Spacewatch || HYG || align=right | 3.5 km || 
|-id=852 bgcolor=#d6d6d6
| 349852 ||  || — || February 19, 2009 || Kitt Peak || Spacewatch || — || align=right | 3.2 km || 
|-id=853 bgcolor=#E9E9E9
| 349853 ||  || — || February 16, 2009 || La Sagra || OAM Obs. || MIS || align=right | 3.0 km || 
|-id=854 bgcolor=#d6d6d6
| 349854 ||  || — || February 20, 2009 || Kitt Peak || Spacewatch || — || align=right | 2.8 km || 
|-id=855 bgcolor=#E9E9E9
| 349855 ||  || — || February 21, 2009 || Catalina || CSS || EUN || align=right | 1.6 km || 
|-id=856 bgcolor=#E9E9E9
| 349856 ||  || — || February 21, 2009 || Catalina || CSS || — || align=right | 2.0 km || 
|-id=857 bgcolor=#E9E9E9
| 349857 ||  || — || February 19, 2009 || Kitt Peak || Spacewatch || — || align=right | 2.7 km || 
|-id=858 bgcolor=#E9E9E9
| 349858 ||  || — || February 18, 2009 || Socorro || LINEAR || — || align=right | 3.2 km || 
|-id=859 bgcolor=#d6d6d6
| 349859 ||  || — || February 20, 2009 || Kitt Peak || Spacewatch || — || align=right | 3.7 km || 
|-id=860 bgcolor=#d6d6d6
| 349860 ||  || — || February 20, 2009 || Kitt Peak || Spacewatch || — || align=right | 3.4 km || 
|-id=861 bgcolor=#E9E9E9
| 349861 ||  || — || February 19, 2009 || La Sagra || OAM Obs. || JUN || align=right | 1.1 km || 
|-id=862 bgcolor=#E9E9E9
| 349862 Modigliani ||  ||  || February 21, 2009 || Vallemare Borbon || V. S. Casulli || — || align=right | 2.2 km || 
|-id=863 bgcolor=#E9E9E9
| 349863 ||  || — || February 28, 2009 || Socorro || LINEAR || POS || align=right | 3.8 km || 
|-id=864 bgcolor=#d6d6d6
| 349864 ||  || — || February 19, 2009 || Kitt Peak || Spacewatch || — || align=right | 2.9 km || 
|-id=865 bgcolor=#E9E9E9
| 349865 ||  || — || February 22, 2009 || Kitt Peak || Spacewatch || — || align=right | 1.5 km || 
|-id=866 bgcolor=#d6d6d6
| 349866 ||  || — || February 22, 2009 || Kitt Peak || Spacewatch || EOS || align=right | 2.4 km || 
|-id=867 bgcolor=#d6d6d6
| 349867 ||  || — || February 22, 2009 || Kitt Peak || Spacewatch || — || align=right | 2.8 km || 
|-id=868 bgcolor=#d6d6d6
| 349868 ||  || — || February 22, 2009 || Kitt Peak || Spacewatch || — || align=right | 2.4 km || 
|-id=869 bgcolor=#d6d6d6
| 349869 ||  || — || February 22, 2009 || Kitt Peak || Spacewatch || — || align=right | 3.7 km || 
|-id=870 bgcolor=#d6d6d6
| 349870 ||  || — || February 22, 2009 || Kitt Peak || Spacewatch || — || align=right | 2.8 km || 
|-id=871 bgcolor=#E9E9E9
| 349871 ||  || — || February 22, 2009 || Catalina || CSS || — || align=right | 2.8 km || 
|-id=872 bgcolor=#E9E9E9
| 349872 ||  || — || February 26, 2009 || Mount Lemmon || Mount Lemmon Survey || — || align=right | 1.3 km || 
|-id=873 bgcolor=#E9E9E9
| 349873 ||  || — || February 17, 2009 || La Sagra || OAM Obs. || — || align=right | 1.4 km || 
|-id=874 bgcolor=#d6d6d6
| 349874 ||  || — || February 26, 2009 || Catalina || CSS || — || align=right | 2.6 km || 
|-id=875 bgcolor=#E9E9E9
| 349875 ||  || — || February 21, 2009 || Mount Lemmon || Mount Lemmon Survey || — || align=right | 2.3 km || 
|-id=876 bgcolor=#d6d6d6
| 349876 ||  || — || February 21, 2009 || Kitt Peak || Spacewatch || — || align=right | 2.5 km || 
|-id=877 bgcolor=#d6d6d6
| 349877 ||  || — || February 24, 2009 || Kitt Peak || Spacewatch || — || align=right | 3.2 km || 
|-id=878 bgcolor=#d6d6d6
| 349878 ||  || — || February 24, 2009 || Kitt Peak || Spacewatch || — || align=right | 2.0 km || 
|-id=879 bgcolor=#d6d6d6
| 349879 ||  || — || February 24, 2009 || Kitt Peak || Spacewatch || — || align=right | 2.2 km || 
|-id=880 bgcolor=#d6d6d6
| 349880 ||  || — || February 26, 2009 || Kitt Peak || Spacewatch || — || align=right | 3.6 km || 
|-id=881 bgcolor=#E9E9E9
| 349881 ||  || — || February 26, 2009 || Kitt Peak || Spacewatch || — || align=right | 2.3 km || 
|-id=882 bgcolor=#d6d6d6
| 349882 ||  || — || October 20, 2006 || Kitt Peak || Spacewatch || — || align=right | 3.1 km || 
|-id=883 bgcolor=#E9E9E9
| 349883 ||  || — || February 27, 2009 || Catalina || CSS || — || align=right | 2.6 km || 
|-id=884 bgcolor=#E9E9E9
| 349884 ||  || — || April 7, 2005 || Mount Lemmon || Mount Lemmon Survey || — || align=right | 2.5 km || 
|-id=885 bgcolor=#d6d6d6
| 349885 ||  || — || February 27, 2009 || Kitt Peak || Spacewatch || THM || align=right | 2.1 km || 
|-id=886 bgcolor=#d6d6d6
| 349886 ||  || — || September 26, 2006 || Kitt Peak || Spacewatch || — || align=right | 2.4 km || 
|-id=887 bgcolor=#d6d6d6
| 349887 ||  || — || February 19, 2009 || Kitt Peak || Spacewatch || — || align=right | 3.5 km || 
|-id=888 bgcolor=#E9E9E9
| 349888 ||  || — || February 20, 2009 || Kitt Peak || Spacewatch || PAD || align=right | 1.7 km || 
|-id=889 bgcolor=#d6d6d6
| 349889 ||  || — || February 27, 2009 || Kitt Peak || Spacewatch || TRE || align=right | 2.3 km || 
|-id=890 bgcolor=#E9E9E9
| 349890 ||  || — || February 22, 2009 || Catalina || CSS || — || align=right | 1.7 km || 
|-id=891 bgcolor=#d6d6d6
| 349891 ||  || — || February 27, 2009 || Catalina || CSS || — || align=right | 2.4 km || 
|-id=892 bgcolor=#d6d6d6
| 349892 ||  || — || February 28, 2009 || Kitt Peak || Spacewatch || THM || align=right | 4.1 km || 
|-id=893 bgcolor=#d6d6d6
| 349893 ||  || — || February 20, 2009 || Kitt Peak || Spacewatch || — || align=right | 2.9 km || 
|-id=894 bgcolor=#d6d6d6
| 349894 ||  || — || March 1, 2009 || Mount Lemmon || Mount Lemmon Survey || EMA || align=right | 3.5 km || 
|-id=895 bgcolor=#d6d6d6
| 349895 ||  || — || March 2, 2009 || Kitt Peak || Spacewatch || — || align=right | 3.8 km || 
|-id=896 bgcolor=#d6d6d6
| 349896 ||  || — || March 20, 2009 || Bergisch Gladbac || W. Bickel || HYG || align=right | 3.3 km || 
|-id=897 bgcolor=#d6d6d6
| 349897 ||  || — || March 20, 2009 || La Sagra || OAM Obs. || TEL || align=right | 2.0 km || 
|-id=898 bgcolor=#d6d6d6
| 349898 ||  || — || March 22, 2009 || Catalina || CSS || — || align=right | 3.2 km || 
|-id=899 bgcolor=#d6d6d6
| 349899 ||  || — || March 26, 2009 || Cerro Burek || Alianza S4 Obs. || URS || align=right | 5.0 km || 
|-id=900 bgcolor=#d6d6d6
| 349900 ||  || — || March 24, 2009 || Kitt Peak || Spacewatch || CHA || align=right | 2.5 km || 
|}

349901–350000 

|-bgcolor=#d6d6d6
| 349901 ||  || — || March 24, 2009 || Kitt Peak || Spacewatch || — || align=right | 3.1 km || 
|-id=902 bgcolor=#d6d6d6
| 349902 ||  || — || March 17, 2009 || Kitt Peak || Spacewatch || KOR || align=right | 1.7 km || 
|-id=903 bgcolor=#E9E9E9
| 349903 ||  || — || March 30, 2009 || Socorro || LINEAR || — || align=right | 2.9 km || 
|-id=904 bgcolor=#E9E9E9
| 349904 ||  || — || March 29, 2009 || Bergisch Gladbac || W. Bickel || — || align=right | 2.9 km || 
|-id=905 bgcolor=#d6d6d6
| 349905 ||  || — || March 28, 2009 || Mount Lemmon || Mount Lemmon Survey || — || align=right | 4.4 km || 
|-id=906 bgcolor=#E9E9E9
| 349906 ||  || — || March 25, 2009 || Hibiscus || N. Teamo || HOF || align=right | 3.2 km || 
|-id=907 bgcolor=#d6d6d6
| 349907 ||  || — || March 31, 2009 || Mount Lemmon || Mount Lemmon Survey || TIR || align=right | 3.1 km || 
|-id=908 bgcolor=#d6d6d6
| 349908 ||  || — || March 17, 2009 || Socorro || LINEAR || — || align=right | 4.1 km || 
|-id=909 bgcolor=#d6d6d6
| 349909 ||  || — || April 17, 2009 || Kitt Peak || Spacewatch || URS || align=right | 3.8 km || 
|-id=910 bgcolor=#d6d6d6
| 349910 ||  || — || April 17, 2009 || Mount Lemmon || Mount Lemmon Survey || — || align=right | 4.9 km || 
|-id=911 bgcolor=#d6d6d6
| 349911 ||  || — || April 27, 2009 || Mount Lemmon || Mount Lemmon Survey || — || align=right | 3.1 km || 
|-id=912 bgcolor=#d6d6d6
| 349912 ||  || — || April 20, 2009 || Mount Lemmon || Mount Lemmon Survey || — || align=right | 2.7 km || 
|-id=913 bgcolor=#d6d6d6
| 349913 ||  || — || May 24, 2009 || Catalina || CSS || — || align=right | 3.5 km || 
|-id=914 bgcolor=#E9E9E9
| 349914 ||  || — || May 26, 2009 || Mount Lemmon || Mount Lemmon Survey || — || align=right | 2.7 km || 
|-id=915 bgcolor=#FA8072
| 349915 ||  || — || August 20, 2009 || Catalina || CSS || H || align=right | 1.0 km || 
|-id=916 bgcolor=#C2FFFF
| 349916 ||  || — || August 28, 2009 || Kitt Peak || Spacewatch || L4 || align=right | 13 km || 
|-id=917 bgcolor=#d6d6d6
| 349917 ||  || — || September 12, 2009 || Kitt Peak || Spacewatch || — || align=right | 4.0 km || 
|-id=918 bgcolor=#C2FFFF
| 349918 ||  || — || August 16, 2009 || Kitt Peak || Spacewatch || L4 || align=right | 8.3 km || 
|-id=919 bgcolor=#C2FFFF
| 349919 ||  || — || September 22, 2009 || Kitt Peak || Spacewatch || L4ERY || align=right | 8.3 km || 
|-id=920 bgcolor=#C2FFFF
| 349920 ||  || — || September 23, 2009 || Kitt Peak || Spacewatch || L4 || align=right | 11 km || 
|-id=921 bgcolor=#d6d6d6
| 349921 ||  || — || September 25, 2009 || Kitt Peak || Spacewatch || — || align=right | 3.0 km || 
|-id=922 bgcolor=#fefefe
| 349922 ||  || — || October 1, 2009 || Charleston || ARO || H || align=right data-sort-value="0.77" | 770 m || 
|-id=923 bgcolor=#C2FFFF
| 349923 ||  || — || September 25, 2009 || Kitt Peak || Spacewatch || L4 || align=right | 10 km || 
|-id=924 bgcolor=#fefefe
| 349924 ||  || — || March 9, 2008 || Siding Spring || SSS || H || align=right | 1.2 km || 
|-id=925 bgcolor=#FFC2E0
| 349925 ||  || — || November 22, 2009 || Catalina || CSS || APO +1km || align=right data-sort-value="0.92" | 920 m || 
|-id=926 bgcolor=#fefefe
| 349926 ||  || — || November 17, 2009 || Kitt Peak || Spacewatch || — || align=right data-sort-value="0.65" | 650 m || 
|-id=927 bgcolor=#fefefe
| 349927 ||  || — || November 19, 2009 || Kitt Peak || Spacewatch || — || align=right data-sort-value="0.75" | 750 m || 
|-id=928 bgcolor=#FFC2E0
| 349928 ||  || — || November 25, 2009 || Socorro || LINEAR || APO || align=right data-sort-value="0.72" | 720 m || 
|-id=929 bgcolor=#fefefe
| 349929 ||  || — || November 8, 2009 || Kitt Peak || Spacewatch || H || align=right data-sort-value="0.89" | 890 m || 
|-id=930 bgcolor=#FA8072
| 349930 ||  || — || February 6, 2007 || Mount Lemmon || Mount Lemmon Survey || — || align=right data-sort-value="0.70" | 700 m || 
|-id=931 bgcolor=#fefefe
| 349931 ||  || — || December 15, 2009 || Mount Lemmon || Mount Lemmon Survey || — || align=right data-sort-value="0.87" | 870 m || 
|-id=932 bgcolor=#E9E9E9
| 349932 ||  || — || December 15, 2009 || Mount Lemmon || Mount Lemmon Survey || HOF || align=right | 3.4 km || 
|-id=933 bgcolor=#C7FF8F
| 349933 ||  || — || December 19, 2009 || La Silla || D. L. Rabinowitz || centaur || align=right | 29 km || 
|-id=934 bgcolor=#fefefe
| 349934 ||  || — || January 5, 2010 || Kitt Peak || Spacewatch || PHO || align=right | 1.5 km || 
|-id=935 bgcolor=#fefefe
| 349935 ||  || — || January 6, 2010 || Kitt Peak || Spacewatch || FLO || align=right data-sort-value="0.63" | 630 m || 
|-id=936 bgcolor=#fefefe
| 349936 ||  || — || January 6, 2010 || Kitt Peak || Spacewatch || — || align=right data-sort-value="0.88" | 880 m || 
|-id=937 bgcolor=#fefefe
| 349937 ||  || — || May 21, 2004 || Kitt Peak || Spacewatch || V || align=right data-sort-value="0.75" | 750 m || 
|-id=938 bgcolor=#fefefe
| 349938 ||  || — || January 8, 2010 || Mount Lemmon || Mount Lemmon Survey || — || align=right data-sort-value="0.99" | 990 m || 
|-id=939 bgcolor=#fefefe
| 349939 ||  || — || January 8, 2010 || Kitt Peak || Spacewatch || ERI || align=right | 1.4 km || 
|-id=940 bgcolor=#fefefe
| 349940 ||  || — || January 8, 2010 || Kitt Peak || Spacewatch || — || align=right | 1.4 km || 
|-id=941 bgcolor=#fefefe
| 349941 ||  || — || February 5, 2010 || Kitt Peak || Spacewatch || MAS || align=right data-sort-value="0.75" | 750 m || 
|-id=942 bgcolor=#fefefe
| 349942 ||  || — || February 9, 2010 || Kitt Peak || Spacewatch || — || align=right data-sort-value="0.81" | 810 m || 
|-id=943 bgcolor=#E9E9E9
| 349943 ||  || — || February 9, 2010 || Kitt Peak || Spacewatch || — || align=right | 1.8 km || 
|-id=944 bgcolor=#fefefe
| 349944 ||  || — || February 9, 2010 || Kitt Peak || Spacewatch || — || align=right | 1.6 km || 
|-id=945 bgcolor=#d6d6d6
| 349945 ||  || — || February 14, 2010 || WISE || WISE || — || align=right | 4.0 km || 
|-id=946 bgcolor=#fefefe
| 349946 ||  || — || February 9, 2010 || Kitt Peak || Spacewatch || — || align=right data-sort-value="0.73" | 730 m || 
|-id=947 bgcolor=#fefefe
| 349947 ||  || — || February 9, 2010 || Kitt Peak || Spacewatch || MAS || align=right data-sort-value="0.76" | 760 m || 
|-id=948 bgcolor=#fefefe
| 349948 ||  || — || February 10, 2010 || Kitt Peak || Spacewatch || — || align=right data-sort-value="0.76" | 760 m || 
|-id=949 bgcolor=#fefefe
| 349949 ||  || — || April 23, 2007 || Mount Lemmon || Mount Lemmon Survey || V || align=right data-sort-value="0.69" | 690 m || 
|-id=950 bgcolor=#fefefe
| 349950 ||  || — || March 2, 1995 || Kitt Peak || Spacewatch || — || align=right data-sort-value="0.93" | 930 m || 
|-id=951 bgcolor=#fefefe
| 349951 ||  || — || February 14, 2010 || Kitt Peak || Spacewatch || — || align=right data-sort-value="0.70" | 700 m || 
|-id=952 bgcolor=#fefefe
| 349952 ||  || — || February 14, 2010 || Kitt Peak || Spacewatch || FLO || align=right data-sort-value="0.64" | 640 m || 
|-id=953 bgcolor=#fefefe
| 349953 ||  || — || February 15, 2010 || Kitt Peak || Spacewatch || NYS || align=right data-sort-value="0.66" | 660 m || 
|-id=954 bgcolor=#fefefe
| 349954 ||  || — || October 6, 2000 || Anderson Mesa || LONEOS || MAS || align=right data-sort-value="0.88" | 880 m || 
|-id=955 bgcolor=#fefefe
| 349955 ||  || — || February 15, 2010 || Kitt Peak || Spacewatch || — || align=right data-sort-value="0.98" | 980 m || 
|-id=956 bgcolor=#fefefe
| 349956 ||  || — || February 13, 2010 || Kitt Peak || Spacewatch || ERI || align=right | 1.7 km || 
|-id=957 bgcolor=#fefefe
| 349957 ||  || — || February 13, 2010 || Kitt Peak || Spacewatch || — || align=right | 1.3 km || 
|-id=958 bgcolor=#fefefe
| 349958 ||  || — || February 14, 2010 || Haleakala || Pan-STARRS || — || align=right data-sort-value="0.67" | 670 m || 
|-id=959 bgcolor=#fefefe
| 349959 ||  || — || February 8, 2010 || WISE || WISE || — || align=right | 2.3 km || 
|-id=960 bgcolor=#E9E9E9
| 349960 ||  || — || September 24, 2008 || Mount Lemmon || Mount Lemmon Survey || — || align=right | 2.7 km || 
|-id=961 bgcolor=#E9E9E9
| 349961 ||  || — || February 19, 2010 || WISE || WISE || — || align=right | 2.2 km || 
|-id=962 bgcolor=#d6d6d6
| 349962 ||  || — || July 3, 2005 || Palomar || NEAT || LIX || align=right | 4.7 km || 
|-id=963 bgcolor=#E9E9E9
| 349963 ||  || — || February 17, 2010 || WISE || WISE || — || align=right | 3.5 km || 
|-id=964 bgcolor=#fefefe
| 349964 ||  || — || January 5, 2006 || Kitt Peak || Spacewatch || NYS || align=right data-sort-value="0.55" | 550 m || 
|-id=965 bgcolor=#E9E9E9
| 349965 ||  || — || February 26, 2010 || WISE || WISE || — || align=right | 4.4 km || 
|-id=966 bgcolor=#d6d6d6
| 349966 ||  || — || March 3, 2010 || WISE || WISE || — || align=right | 5.2 km || 
|-id=967 bgcolor=#E9E9E9
| 349967 ||  || — || March 3, 2010 || WISE || WISE || MIT || align=right | 2.2 km || 
|-id=968 bgcolor=#fefefe
| 349968 ||  || — || March 4, 2010 || Kitt Peak || Spacewatch || — || align=right data-sort-value="0.86" | 860 m || 
|-id=969 bgcolor=#E9E9E9
| 349969 ||  || — || March 4, 2010 || Kitt Peak || Spacewatch || — || align=right | 2.1 km || 
|-id=970 bgcolor=#fefefe
| 349970 ||  || — || March 10, 2010 || Purple Mountain || PMO NEO || — || align=right data-sort-value="0.87" | 870 m || 
|-id=971 bgcolor=#E9E9E9
| 349971 ||  || — || February 14, 2010 || Mount Lemmon || Mount Lemmon Survey || MAR || align=right | 1.2 km || 
|-id=972 bgcolor=#E9E9E9
| 349972 ||  || — || March 2, 2006 || Kitt Peak || Spacewatch || — || align=right | 1.7 km || 
|-id=973 bgcolor=#E9E9E9
| 349973 ||  || — || March 12, 2010 || Catalina || CSS || — || align=right | 1.2 km || 
|-id=974 bgcolor=#fefefe
| 349974 ||  || — || March 10, 2003 || Anderson Mesa || LONEOS || V || align=right data-sort-value="0.89" | 890 m || 
|-id=975 bgcolor=#fefefe
| 349975 ||  || — || November 11, 2001 || Apache Point || SDSS || — || align=right data-sort-value="0.93" | 930 m || 
|-id=976 bgcolor=#E9E9E9
| 349976 ||  || — || March 13, 2010 || Kitt Peak || Spacewatch || — || align=right | 1.8 km || 
|-id=977 bgcolor=#E9E9E9
| 349977 ||  || — || January 26, 2006 || Kitt Peak || Spacewatch || EUN || align=right | 1.6 km || 
|-id=978 bgcolor=#E9E9E9
| 349978 ||  || — || March 15, 2010 || Mount Lemmon || Mount Lemmon Survey || — || align=right | 1.7 km || 
|-id=979 bgcolor=#fefefe
| 349979 ||  || — || March 13, 2010 || Mount Lemmon || Mount Lemmon Survey || — || align=right data-sort-value="0.86" | 860 m || 
|-id=980 bgcolor=#fefefe
| 349980 ||  || — || March 12, 2010 || Kitt Peak || Spacewatch || — || align=right data-sort-value="0.70" | 700 m || 
|-id=981 bgcolor=#E9E9E9
| 349981 ||  || — || March 5, 2010 || Catalina || CSS || — || align=right | 1.8 km || 
|-id=982 bgcolor=#fefefe
| 349982 ||  || — || October 28, 2008 || Mount Lemmon || Mount Lemmon Survey || — || align=right data-sort-value="0.96" | 960 m || 
|-id=983 bgcolor=#fefefe
| 349983 ||  || — || March 15, 2010 || Kitt Peak || Spacewatch || — || align=right | 1.2 km || 
|-id=984 bgcolor=#fefefe
| 349984 ||  || — || April 4, 2003 || Kitt Peak || Spacewatch || NYS || align=right data-sort-value="0.66" | 660 m || 
|-id=985 bgcolor=#fefefe
| 349985 ||  || — || March 7, 2003 || Anderson Mesa || LONEOS || FLO || align=right data-sort-value="0.88" | 880 m || 
|-id=986 bgcolor=#E9E9E9
| 349986 ||  || — || March 15, 2010 || Kitt Peak || Spacewatch || — || align=right | 2.0 km || 
|-id=987 bgcolor=#E9E9E9
| 349987 ||  || — || September 25, 2008 || Kitt Peak || Spacewatch || — || align=right data-sort-value="0.98" | 980 m || 
|-id=988 bgcolor=#E9E9E9
| 349988 ||  || — || September 17, 2003 || Kitt Peak || Spacewatch || — || align=right | 1.4 km || 
|-id=989 bgcolor=#fefefe
| 349989 ||  || — || December 5, 2008 || Kitt Peak || Spacewatch || — || align=right | 1.3 km || 
|-id=990 bgcolor=#E9E9E9
| 349990 ||  || — || September 26, 2003 || Apache Point || SDSS || — || align=right | 2.0 km || 
|-id=991 bgcolor=#E9E9E9
| 349991 ||  || — || June 21, 2007 || Mount Lemmon || Mount Lemmon Survey || — || align=right | 1.8 km || 
|-id=992 bgcolor=#E9E9E9
| 349992 ||  || — || February 16, 2010 || Kitt Peak || Spacewatch || — || align=right | 2.9 km || 
|-id=993 bgcolor=#E9E9E9
| 349993 ||  || — || March 19, 2010 || Mount Lemmon || Mount Lemmon Survey || — || align=right | 1.6 km || 
|-id=994 bgcolor=#fefefe
| 349994 ||  || — || March 18, 2010 || Kitt Peak || Spacewatch || NYS || align=right data-sort-value="0.62" | 620 m || 
|-id=995 bgcolor=#E9E9E9
| 349995 ||  || — || March 20, 2010 || Catalina || CSS || — || align=right | 3.0 km || 
|-id=996 bgcolor=#d6d6d6
| 349996 ||  || — || January 14, 2010 || WISE || WISE || — || align=right | 4.0 km || 
|-id=997 bgcolor=#E9E9E9
| 349997 ||  || — || October 9, 2007 || Kitt Peak || Spacewatch || — || align=right | 2.4 km || 
|-id=998 bgcolor=#fefefe
| 349998 ||  || — || April 5, 2010 || Kitt Peak || Spacewatch || — || align=right data-sort-value="0.98" | 980 m || 
|-id=999 bgcolor=#E9E9E9
| 349999 ||  || — || April 6, 2010 || Kitt Peak || Spacewatch || RAF || align=right | 1.2 km || 
|-id=000 bgcolor=#fefefe
| 350000 ||  || — || April 6, 2010 || Kitt Peak || Spacewatch || — || align=right | 1.3 km || 
|}

References

External links 
 Discovery Circumstances: Numbered Minor Planets (345001)–(350000) (IAU Minor Planet Center)

0349